

583001–583100 

|-bgcolor=#E9E9E9
| 583001 ||  || — || February 14, 1999 || Caussols || ODAS ||  || align=right | 1.2 km || 
|-id=002 bgcolor=#E9E9E9
| 583002 ||  || — || February 12, 2016 || Haleakala || Pan-STARRS ||  || align=right | 1.4 km || 
|-id=003 bgcolor=#E9E9E9
| 583003 ||  || — || February 6, 2016 || Haleakala || Pan-STARRS ||  || align=right data-sort-value="0.90" | 900 m || 
|-id=004 bgcolor=#E9E9E9
| 583004 ||  || — || February 10, 2016 || Haleakala || Pan-STARRS ||  || align=right | 1.2 km || 
|-id=005 bgcolor=#fefefe
| 583005 ||  || — || February 6, 2016 || Mount Lemmon || A. R. Gibbs ||  || align=right data-sort-value="0.73" | 730 m || 
|-id=006 bgcolor=#fefefe
| 583006 ||  || — || February 3, 2016 || Mount Lemmon || Mount Lemmon Survey ||  || align=right data-sort-value="0.68" | 680 m || 
|-id=007 bgcolor=#fefefe
| 583007 ||  || — || February 11, 2016 || Haleakala || Pan-STARRS ||  || align=right data-sort-value="0.93" | 930 m || 
|-id=008 bgcolor=#E9E9E9
| 583008 ||  || — || February 14, 2016 || Haleakala || Pan-STARRS ||  || align=right | 1.1 km || 
|-id=009 bgcolor=#E9E9E9
| 583009 ||  || — || February 10, 2016 || Haleakala || Pan-STARRS ||  || align=right | 1.4 km || 
|-id=010 bgcolor=#E9E9E9
| 583010 ||  || — || July 16, 2013 || Haleakala || Pan-STARRS ||  || align=right | 1.2 km || 
|-id=011 bgcolor=#E9E9E9
| 583011 ||  || — || February 26, 2012 || Haleakala || Pan-STARRS ||  || align=right data-sort-value="0.71" | 710 m || 
|-id=012 bgcolor=#fefefe
| 583012 ||  || — || October 8, 2007 || Mount Lemmon || Mount Lemmon Survey ||  || align=right data-sort-value="0.63" | 630 m || 
|-id=013 bgcolor=#fefefe
| 583013 ||  || — || December 30, 2011 || Mount Lemmon || Mount Lemmon Survey ||  || align=right data-sort-value="0.68" | 680 m || 
|-id=014 bgcolor=#fefefe
| 583014 ||  || — || October 12, 2007 || Kitt Peak || Spacewatch ||  || align=right data-sort-value="0.62" | 620 m || 
|-id=015 bgcolor=#E9E9E9
| 583015 ||  || — || March 15, 2004 || Kitt Peak || Spacewatch ||  || align=right data-sort-value="0.75" | 750 m || 
|-id=016 bgcolor=#fefefe
| 583016 ||  || — || October 17, 2010 || Mount Lemmon || Mount Lemmon Survey ||  || align=right data-sort-value="0.80" | 800 m || 
|-id=017 bgcolor=#E9E9E9
| 583017 ||  || — || July 14, 2013 || Haleakala || Pan-STARRS ||  || align=right | 1.4 km || 
|-id=018 bgcolor=#E9E9E9
| 583018 ||  || — || February 27, 2012 || Kitt Peak || Spacewatch ||  || align=right | 1.1 km || 
|-id=019 bgcolor=#E9E9E9
| 583019 ||  || — || August 15, 2013 || Haleakala || Pan-STARRS ||  || align=right | 1.2 km || 
|-id=020 bgcolor=#fefefe
| 583020 ||  || — || September 16, 2003 || Kitt Peak || Spacewatch ||  || align=right data-sort-value="0.97" | 970 m || 
|-id=021 bgcolor=#E9E9E9
| 583021 ||  || — || February 6, 1999 || Mauna Kea || C. Veillet, J. Anderson ||  || align=right data-sort-value="0.74" | 740 m || 
|-id=022 bgcolor=#E9E9E9
| 583022 ||  || — || August 15, 2004 || Cerro Tololo || Cerro Tololo Obs. ||  || align=right | 1.2 km || 
|-id=023 bgcolor=#fefefe
| 583023 ||  || — || April 27, 2009 || Mount Lemmon || Mount Lemmon Survey ||  || align=right data-sort-value="0.66" | 660 m || 
|-id=024 bgcolor=#E9E9E9
| 583024 ||  || — || March 15, 2008 || Mount Lemmon || Mount Lemmon Survey ||  || align=right | 1.3 km || 
|-id=025 bgcolor=#fefefe
| 583025 ||  || — || February 4, 2012 || Haleakala || Pan-STARRS ||  || align=right | 1.00 km || 
|-id=026 bgcolor=#fefefe
| 583026 ||  || — || March 11, 2005 || Mount Lemmon || Mount Lemmon Survey ||  || align=right data-sort-value="0.69" | 690 m || 
|-id=027 bgcolor=#E9E9E9
| 583027 ||  || — || February 29, 2016 || Haleakala || Pan-STARRS ||  || align=right | 1.7 km || 
|-id=028 bgcolor=#E9E9E9
| 583028 ||  || — || February 1, 1995 || Kitt Peak || Spacewatch ||  || align=right data-sort-value="0.69" | 690 m || 
|-id=029 bgcolor=#fefefe
| 583029 ||  || — || April 13, 2001 || Kitt Peak || Spacewatch ||  || align=right data-sort-value="0.80" | 800 m || 
|-id=030 bgcolor=#E9E9E9
| 583030 ||  || — || February 29, 2016 || Haleakala || Pan-STARRS ||  || align=right data-sort-value="0.94" | 940 m || 
|-id=031 bgcolor=#E9E9E9
| 583031 ||  || — || March 2, 2016 || Haleakala || Pan-STARRS ||  || align=right | 1.1 km || 
|-id=032 bgcolor=#E9E9E9
| 583032 ||  || — || May 22, 2012 || ESA OGS || ESA OGS ||  || align=right | 1.4 km || 
|-id=033 bgcolor=#E9E9E9
| 583033 ||  || — || January 11, 2008 || Mount Lemmon || Mount Lemmon Survey ||  || align=right | 1.1 km || 
|-id=034 bgcolor=#E9E9E9
| 583034 ||  || — || January 16, 2011 || Mount Lemmon || Mount Lemmon Survey ||  || align=right | 1.7 km || 
|-id=035 bgcolor=#E9E9E9
| 583035 ||  || — || February 4, 2016 || Haleakala || Pan-STARRS ||  || align=right | 1.0 km || 
|-id=036 bgcolor=#E9E9E9
| 583036 ||  || — || July 26, 2005 || Palomar || NEAT ||  || align=right | 1.4 km || 
|-id=037 bgcolor=#E9E9E9
| 583037 ||  || — || December 14, 2010 || Mount Lemmon || Mount Lemmon Survey ||  || align=right | 1.7 km || 
|-id=038 bgcolor=#E9E9E9
| 583038 ||  || — || September 17, 2014 || Haleakala || Pan-STARRS ||  || align=right | 1.6 km || 
|-id=039 bgcolor=#E9E9E9
| 583039 ||  || — || January 16, 2016 || Haleakala || Pan-STARRS ||  || align=right | 1.4 km || 
|-id=040 bgcolor=#E9E9E9
| 583040 ||  || — || February 12, 2016 || Haleakala || Pan-STARRS ||  || align=right | 1.2 km || 
|-id=041 bgcolor=#E9E9E9
| 583041 ||  || — || July 14, 2013 || Haleakala || Pan-STARRS ||  || align=right data-sort-value="0.85" | 850 m || 
|-id=042 bgcolor=#E9E9E9
| 583042 ||  || — || December 26, 2014 || Haleakala || Pan-STARRS ||  || align=right | 1.0 km || 
|-id=043 bgcolor=#E9E9E9
| 583043 ||  || — || June 30, 2008 || Kitt Peak || Spacewatch ||  || align=right | 1.9 km || 
|-id=044 bgcolor=#d6d6d6
| 583044 ||  || — || March 3, 2016 || Haleakala || Pan-STARRS ||  || align=right | 1.8 km || 
|-id=045 bgcolor=#E9E9E9
| 583045 ||  || — || November 17, 2014 || Haleakala || Pan-STARRS ||  || align=right | 1.1 km || 
|-id=046 bgcolor=#fefefe
| 583046 ||  || — || April 17, 2009 || Kitt Peak || Spacewatch ||  || align=right data-sort-value="0.70" | 700 m || 
|-id=047 bgcolor=#fefefe
| 583047 ||  || — || February 4, 2016 || Haleakala || Pan-STARRS ||  || align=right data-sort-value="0.72" | 720 m || 
|-id=048 bgcolor=#fefefe
| 583048 ||  || — || September 20, 2003 || Palomar || NEAT ||  || align=right data-sort-value="0.79" | 790 m || 
|-id=049 bgcolor=#E9E9E9
| 583049 ||  || — || July 28, 2005 || Palomar || NEAT ||  || align=right | 1.8 km || 
|-id=050 bgcolor=#E9E9E9
| 583050 ||  || — || December 2, 2005 || Mount Lemmon || Mount Lemmon Survey ||  || align=right | 3.1 km || 
|-id=051 bgcolor=#fefefe
| 583051 ||  || — || November 17, 2011 || Kitt Peak || Spacewatch ||  || align=right data-sort-value="0.84" | 840 m || 
|-id=052 bgcolor=#E9E9E9
| 583052 ||  || — || February 8, 2007 || Mount Lemmon || Mount Lemmon Survey ||  || align=right | 1.4 km || 
|-id=053 bgcolor=#E9E9E9
| 583053 ||  || — || August 10, 2013 || Palomar || PTF ||  || align=right | 1.6 km || 
|-id=054 bgcolor=#E9E9E9
| 583054 ||  || — || January 14, 2011 || Mount Lemmon || Mount Lemmon Survey ||  || align=right | 1.5 km || 
|-id=055 bgcolor=#E9E9E9
| 583055 ||  || — || August 1, 2009 || Kitt Peak || Spacewatch ||  || align=right | 1.0 km || 
|-id=056 bgcolor=#E9E9E9
| 583056 ||  || — || December 9, 2015 || Haleakala || Pan-STARRS ||  || align=right | 1.0 km || 
|-id=057 bgcolor=#E9E9E9
| 583057 ||  || — || December 12, 2015 || Haleakala || Pan-STARRS ||  || align=right | 1.4 km || 
|-id=058 bgcolor=#E9E9E9
| 583058 ||  || — || November 3, 2010 || Kitt Peak || Spacewatch ||  || align=right | 1.4 km || 
|-id=059 bgcolor=#E9E9E9
| 583059 ||  || — || January 4, 2016 || Haleakala || Pan-STARRS ||  || align=right | 1.2 km || 
|-id=060 bgcolor=#fefefe
| 583060 ||  || — || October 2, 2006 || Kitt Peak || Spacewatch ||  || align=right data-sort-value="0.73" | 730 m || 
|-id=061 bgcolor=#fefefe
| 583061 ||  || — || March 14, 2013 || Kitt Peak || Spacewatch ||  || align=right data-sort-value="0.44" | 440 m || 
|-id=062 bgcolor=#E9E9E9
| 583062 ||  || — || April 12, 2008 || Kitt Peak || Spacewatch ||  || align=right data-sort-value="0.62" | 620 m || 
|-id=063 bgcolor=#E9E9E9
| 583063 ||  || — || January 20, 2015 || Haleakala || Pan-STARRS ||  || align=right | 1.6 km || 
|-id=064 bgcolor=#d6d6d6
| 583064 ||  || — || March 4, 2016 || Haleakala || Pan-STARRS ||  || align=right | 2.7 km || 
|-id=065 bgcolor=#E9E9E9
| 583065 ||  || — || June 6, 2008 || Kitt Peak || Spacewatch ||  || align=right | 2.1 km || 
|-id=066 bgcolor=#E9E9E9
| 583066 ||  || — || March 4, 2016 || Haleakala || Pan-STARRS ||  || align=right data-sort-value="0.95" | 950 m || 
|-id=067 bgcolor=#E9E9E9
| 583067 ||  || — || September 1, 2013 || Haleakala || Pan-STARRS ||  || align=right | 1.7 km || 
|-id=068 bgcolor=#E9E9E9
| 583068 ||  || — || January 12, 2016 || Haleakala || Pan-STARRS ||  || align=right data-sort-value="0.79" | 790 m || 
|-id=069 bgcolor=#fefefe
| 583069 ||  || — || September 10, 2010 || Kitt Peak || Spacewatch ||  || align=right data-sort-value="0.78" | 780 m || 
|-id=070 bgcolor=#E9E9E9
| 583070 ||  || — || February 13, 2011 || Mount Lemmon || Mount Lemmon Survey ||  || align=right | 1.7 km || 
|-id=071 bgcolor=#E9E9E9
| 583071 ||  || — || March 28, 2012 || Mount Lemmon || Mount Lemmon Survey ||  || align=right | 1.2 km || 
|-id=072 bgcolor=#E9E9E9
| 583072 ||  || — || February 24, 1995 || Kitt Peak || Spacewatch ||  || align=right data-sort-value="0.97" | 970 m || 
|-id=073 bgcolor=#E9E9E9
| 583073 ||  || — || August 14, 2013 || Haleakala || Pan-STARRS ||  || align=right data-sort-value="0.99" | 990 m || 
|-id=074 bgcolor=#E9E9E9
| 583074 ||  || — || March 5, 2016 || Haleakala || Pan-STARRS ||  || align=right | 2.2 km || 
|-id=075 bgcolor=#fefefe
| 583075 ||  || — || February 3, 2012 || Mount Lemmon || Mount Lemmon Survey ||  || align=right data-sort-value="0.69" | 690 m || 
|-id=076 bgcolor=#E9E9E9
| 583076 ||  || — || October 2, 2014 || Kitt Peak || Spacewatch ||  || align=right | 1.4 km || 
|-id=077 bgcolor=#fefefe
| 583077 ||  || — || April 29, 2009 || Mount Lemmon || Mount Lemmon Survey ||  || align=right data-sort-value="0.86" | 860 m || 
|-id=078 bgcolor=#E9E9E9
| 583078 ||  || — || August 12, 2013 || Haleakala || Pan-STARRS ||  || align=right data-sort-value="0.89" | 890 m || 
|-id=079 bgcolor=#E9E9E9
| 583079 ||  || — || March 22, 2012 || Mayhill-ISON || L. Elenin ||  || align=right data-sort-value="0.90" | 900 m || 
|-id=080 bgcolor=#E9E9E9
| 583080 ||  || — || January 9, 2016 || Haleakala || Pan-STARRS ||  || align=right | 1.2 km || 
|-id=081 bgcolor=#E9E9E9
| 583081 ||  || — || March 6, 2008 || Mount Lemmon || Mount Lemmon Survey ||  || align=right data-sort-value="0.84" | 840 m || 
|-id=082 bgcolor=#E9E9E9
| 583082 ||  || — || April 8, 2003 || Palomar || NEAT ||  || align=right | 1.3 km || 
|-id=083 bgcolor=#E9E9E9
| 583083 ||  || — || May 18, 2012 || Mount Lemmon || Mount Lemmon Survey ||  || align=right | 1.0 km || 
|-id=084 bgcolor=#fefefe
| 583084 ||  || — || September 26, 2006 || Kitt Peak || Spacewatch ||  || align=right data-sort-value="0.80" | 800 m || 
|-id=085 bgcolor=#E9E9E9
| 583085 ||  || — || October 15, 2002 || Palomar || NEAT ||  || align=right | 1.1 km || 
|-id=086 bgcolor=#E9E9E9
| 583086 ||  || — || March 27, 2012 || Mount Lemmon || Mount Lemmon Survey ||  || align=right | 1.1 km || 
|-id=087 bgcolor=#E9E9E9
| 583087 ||  || — || March 29, 2008 || Mount Lemmon || Mount Lemmon Survey ||  || align=right data-sort-value="0.69" | 690 m || 
|-id=088 bgcolor=#fefefe
| 583088 ||  || — || April 21, 2013 || Mount Lemmon || Mount Lemmon Survey ||  || align=right data-sort-value="0.75" | 750 m || 
|-id=089 bgcolor=#fefefe
| 583089 ||  || — || November 20, 2003 || Kitt Peak || Spacewatch ||  || align=right data-sort-value="0.85" | 850 m || 
|-id=090 bgcolor=#fefefe
| 583090 ||  || — || January 3, 2012 || Kitt Peak || Spacewatch ||  || align=right data-sort-value="0.81" | 810 m || 
|-id=091 bgcolor=#E9E9E9
| 583091 ||  || — || November 22, 2014 || Haleakala || Pan-STARRS || EUN || align=right data-sort-value="0.96" | 960 m || 
|-id=092 bgcolor=#E9E9E9
| 583092 ||  || — || January 28, 2007 || Mount Lemmon || Mount Lemmon Survey ||  || align=right | 1.6 km || 
|-id=093 bgcolor=#fefefe
| 583093 ||  || — || December 29, 1999 || Mauna Kea || C. Veillet ||  || align=right data-sort-value="0.70" | 700 m || 
|-id=094 bgcolor=#E9E9E9
| 583094 ||  || — || February 25, 2007 || Kitt Peak || Spacewatch || MRX || align=right data-sort-value="0.84" | 840 m || 
|-id=095 bgcolor=#fefefe
| 583095 ||  || — || January 27, 2012 || Mount Lemmon || Mount Lemmon Survey ||  || align=right data-sort-value="0.70" | 700 m || 
|-id=096 bgcolor=#fefefe
| 583096 ||  || — || December 6, 2011 || Haleakala || Pan-STARRS ||  || align=right data-sort-value="0.52" | 520 m || 
|-id=097 bgcolor=#E9E9E9
| 583097 ||  || — || July 14, 2013 || Haleakala || Pan-STARRS ||  || align=right | 1.3 km || 
|-id=098 bgcolor=#E9E9E9
| 583098 ||  || — || February 13, 2004 || Kitt Peak || Spacewatch ||  || align=right data-sort-value="0.80" | 800 m || 
|-id=099 bgcolor=#fefefe
| 583099 ||  || — || October 9, 2007 || Mount Lemmon || Mount Lemmon Survey ||  || align=right data-sort-value="0.64" | 640 m || 
|-id=100 bgcolor=#fefefe
| 583100 ||  || — || February 24, 2012 || Mount Lemmon || Mount Lemmon Survey ||  || align=right data-sort-value="0.77" | 770 m || 
|}

583101–583200 

|-bgcolor=#E9E9E9
| 583101 ||  || — || July 3, 2005 || Apache Point || J. C. Barentine ||  || align=right | 1.0 km || 
|-id=102 bgcolor=#fefefe
| 583102 ||  || — || September 20, 2014 || Haleakala || Pan-STARRS ||  || align=right data-sort-value="0.75" | 750 m || 
|-id=103 bgcolor=#fefefe
| 583103 ||  || — || April 18, 2005 || Kitt Peak || Spacewatch ||  || align=right data-sort-value="0.73" | 730 m || 
|-id=104 bgcolor=#fefefe
| 583104 ||  || — || January 19, 2012 || Haleakala || Pan-STARRS ||  || align=right data-sort-value="0.68" | 680 m || 
|-id=105 bgcolor=#E9E9E9
| 583105 ||  || — || May 30, 2012 || Mount Lemmon || Mount Lemmon Survey ||  || align=right | 1.6 km || 
|-id=106 bgcolor=#E9E9E9
| 583106 ||  || — || May 15, 2012 || Haleakala || Pan-STARRS ||  || align=right | 2.2 km || 
|-id=107 bgcolor=#E9E9E9
| 583107 ||  || — || January 13, 2016 || Haleakala || Pan-STARRS ||  || align=right | 1.3 km || 
|-id=108 bgcolor=#fefefe
| 583108 ||  || — || January 19, 2012 || Haleakala || Pan-STARRS ||  || align=right data-sort-value="0.58" | 580 m || 
|-id=109 bgcolor=#fefefe
| 583109 ||  || — || February 25, 2012 || Mount Lemmon || Mount Lemmon Survey ||  || align=right data-sort-value="0.71" | 710 m || 
|-id=110 bgcolor=#E9E9E9
| 583110 ||  || — || January 18, 2016 || Haleakala || Pan-STARRS ||  || align=right | 1.2 km || 
|-id=111 bgcolor=#fefefe
| 583111 ||  || — || July 14, 2013 || Haleakala || Pan-STARRS ||  || align=right data-sort-value="0.83" | 830 m || 
|-id=112 bgcolor=#E9E9E9
| 583112 ||  || — || November 6, 2005 || Kitt Peak || Spacewatch ||  || align=right | 1.2 km || 
|-id=113 bgcolor=#E9E9E9
| 583113 ||  || — || October 17, 2010 || Mount Lemmon || Mount Lemmon Survey ||  || align=right data-sort-value="0.66" | 660 m || 
|-id=114 bgcolor=#E9E9E9
| 583114 ||  || — || July 27, 2009 || Kitt Peak || Spacewatch ||  || align=right data-sort-value="0.95" | 950 m || 
|-id=115 bgcolor=#fefefe
| 583115 ||  || — || December 30, 2014 || Mount Lemmon || Mount Lemmon Survey ||  || align=right data-sort-value="0.83" | 830 m || 
|-id=116 bgcolor=#E9E9E9
| 583116 ||  || — || October 1, 2013 || Mount Lemmon || Mount Lemmon Survey ||  || align=right | 1.0 km || 
|-id=117 bgcolor=#E9E9E9
| 583117 ||  || — || April 27, 2012 || Haleakala || Pan-STARRS ||  || align=right data-sort-value="0.76" | 760 m || 
|-id=118 bgcolor=#E9E9E9
| 583118 ||  || — || October 1, 2005 || Mount Lemmon || Mount Lemmon Survey ||  || align=right | 1.6 km || 
|-id=119 bgcolor=#E9E9E9
| 583119 ||  || — || September 29, 2009 || Kitt Peak || Spacewatch ||  || align=right | 1.4 km || 
|-id=120 bgcolor=#E9E9E9
| 583120 ||  || — || March 15, 2007 || Kitt Peak || Spacewatch ||  || align=right | 1.4 km || 
|-id=121 bgcolor=#E9E9E9
| 583121 ||  || — || October 24, 2009 || Kitt Peak || Spacewatch ||  || align=right | 1.5 km || 
|-id=122 bgcolor=#fefefe
| 583122 ||  || — || March 10, 2016 || Haleakala || Pan-STARRS ||  || align=right data-sort-value="0.89" | 890 m || 
|-id=123 bgcolor=#fefefe
| 583123 ||  || — || November 19, 2003 || Kitt Peak || Spacewatch ||  || align=right data-sort-value="0.68" | 680 m || 
|-id=124 bgcolor=#E9E9E9
| 583124 ||  || — || March 2, 2016 || Haleakala || Pan-STARRS ||  || align=right | 1.1 km || 
|-id=125 bgcolor=#E9E9E9
| 583125 ||  || — || October 5, 2013 || Mount Lemmon || Mount Lemmon Survey ||  || align=right | 1.4 km || 
|-id=126 bgcolor=#fefefe
| 583126 ||  || — || October 29, 1994 || Kitt Peak || Spacewatch ||  || align=right data-sort-value="0.89" | 890 m || 
|-id=127 bgcolor=#fefefe
| 583127 ||  || — || March 2, 2009 || Mount Lemmon || Mount Lemmon Survey ||  || align=right data-sort-value="0.69" | 690 m || 
|-id=128 bgcolor=#E9E9E9
| 583128 ||  || — || April 1, 2003 || Kitt Peak || M. W. Buie, A. B. Jordan || ADE || align=right | 1.5 km || 
|-id=129 bgcolor=#fefefe
| 583129 ||  || — || February 3, 2012 || Haleakala || Pan-STARRS ||  || align=right data-sort-value="0.62" | 620 m || 
|-id=130 bgcolor=#d6d6d6
| 583130 ||  || — || March 11, 2003 || Palomar || NEAT || 7:4 || align=right | 4.2 km || 
|-id=131 bgcolor=#E9E9E9
| 583131 ||  || — || January 25, 2007 || Kitt Peak || Spacewatch ||  || align=right | 1.2 km || 
|-id=132 bgcolor=#E9E9E9
| 583132 ||  || — || March 27, 2008 || Kitt Peak || Spacewatch ||  || align=right | 1.0 km || 
|-id=133 bgcolor=#fefefe
| 583133 ||  || — || July 14, 2013 || Haleakala || Pan-STARRS ||  || align=right data-sort-value="0.75" | 750 m || 
|-id=134 bgcolor=#E9E9E9
| 583134 ||  || — || March 4, 2008 || Mount Lemmon || Mount Lemmon Survey ||  || align=right data-sort-value="0.89" | 890 m || 
|-id=135 bgcolor=#E9E9E9
| 583135 ||  || — || March 11, 2007 || Kitt Peak || Spacewatch ||  || align=right | 1.7 km || 
|-id=136 bgcolor=#E9E9E9
| 583136 ||  || — || April 4, 2008 || Kitt Peak || Spacewatch ||  || align=right data-sort-value="0.83" | 830 m || 
|-id=137 bgcolor=#fefefe
| 583137 ||  || — || August 14, 2013 || Haleakala || Pan-STARRS ||  || align=right data-sort-value="0.87" | 870 m || 
|-id=138 bgcolor=#fefefe
| 583138 ||  || — || March 23, 2006 || Mount Lemmon || Mount Lemmon Survey ||  || align=right data-sort-value="0.61" | 610 m || 
|-id=139 bgcolor=#E9E9E9
| 583139 ||  || — || March 11, 2003 || Palomar || NEAT ||  || align=right | 1.4 km || 
|-id=140 bgcolor=#E9E9E9
| 583140 ||  || — || March 15, 2012 || Kitt Peak || Spacewatch ||  || align=right | 1.00 km || 
|-id=141 bgcolor=#fefefe
| 583141 ||  || — || April 21, 2006 || Kitt Peak || Spacewatch ||  || align=right data-sort-value="0.71" | 710 m || 
|-id=142 bgcolor=#E9E9E9
| 583142 ||  || — || November 22, 2014 || Haleakala || Pan-STARRS ||  || align=right data-sort-value="0.90" | 900 m || 
|-id=143 bgcolor=#E9E9E9
| 583143 ||  || — || October 25, 2014 || Kitt Peak || Spacewatch ||  || align=right | 1.3 km || 
|-id=144 bgcolor=#E9E9E9
| 583144 ||  || — || January 6, 2012 || Haleakala || Pan-STARRS ||  || align=right | 1.5 km || 
|-id=145 bgcolor=#E9E9E9
| 583145 ||  || — || November 17, 2014 || Haleakala || Pan-STARRS ||  || align=right | 1.9 km || 
|-id=146 bgcolor=#fefefe
| 583146 ||  || — || May 27, 2009 || Mount Lemmon || Mount Lemmon Survey ||  || align=right data-sort-value="0.62" | 620 m || 
|-id=147 bgcolor=#E9E9E9
| 583147 ||  || — || March 11, 2016 || Haleakala || Pan-STARRS ||  || align=right data-sort-value="0.77" | 770 m || 
|-id=148 bgcolor=#fefefe
| 583148 ||  || — || October 4, 2006 || Mount Lemmon || Mount Lemmon Survey ||  || align=right data-sort-value="0.83" | 830 m || 
|-id=149 bgcolor=#E9E9E9
| 583149 ||  || — || April 1, 2003 || Apache Point || SDSS Collaboration ||  || align=right | 1.0 km || 
|-id=150 bgcolor=#E9E9E9
| 583150 ||  || — || March 9, 2007 || Goodricke-Pigott || R. A. Tucker ||  || align=right | 2.2 km || 
|-id=151 bgcolor=#E9E9E9
| 583151 ||  || — || October 1, 2005 || Kitt Peak || Spacewatch ||  || align=right | 1.8 km || 
|-id=152 bgcolor=#E9E9E9
| 583152 ||  || — || May 12, 2012 || Mount Lemmon || Mount Lemmon Survey ||  || align=right | 1.0 km || 
|-id=153 bgcolor=#E9E9E9
| 583153 ||  || — || April 25, 2003 || Kitt Peak || Spacewatch ||  || align=right | 1.4 km || 
|-id=154 bgcolor=#E9E9E9
| 583154 ||  || — || September 9, 2013 || Haleakala || Pan-STARRS ||  || align=right data-sort-value="0.90" | 900 m || 
|-id=155 bgcolor=#E9E9E9
| 583155 ||  || — || May 2, 2003 || Socorro || LINEAR ||  || align=right | 1.9 km || 
|-id=156 bgcolor=#E9E9E9
| 583156 ||  || — || March 16, 2012 || Haleakala || Pan-STARRS ||  || align=right | 1.4 km || 
|-id=157 bgcolor=#E9E9E9
| 583157 ||  || — || July 14, 2013 || Haleakala || Pan-STARRS ||  || align=right data-sort-value="0.88" | 880 m || 
|-id=158 bgcolor=#E9E9E9
| 583158 ||  || — || August 1, 2013 || Haleakala || Pan-STARRS ||  || align=right data-sort-value="0.87" | 870 m || 
|-id=159 bgcolor=#E9E9E9
| 583159 ||  || — || June 17, 2004 || Kitt Peak || Spacewatch ||  || align=right | 1.5 km || 
|-id=160 bgcolor=#E9E9E9
| 583160 ||  || — || October 26, 2005 || Kitt Peak || Spacewatch ||  || align=right | 1.4 km || 
|-id=161 bgcolor=#E9E9E9
| 583161 ||  || — || April 26, 2003 || Socorro || LINEAR ||  || align=right | 1.6 km || 
|-id=162 bgcolor=#E9E9E9
| 583162 ||  || — || October 25, 2013 || Haleakala || Pan-STARRS ||  || align=right | 1.6 km || 
|-id=163 bgcolor=#E9E9E9
| 583163 ||  || — || September 23, 2013 || Mount Lemmon || Mount Lemmon Survey ||  || align=right | 2.0 km || 
|-id=164 bgcolor=#E9E9E9
| 583164 ||  || — || June 12, 2008 || Kitt Peak || Spacewatch ||  || align=right | 1.8 km || 
|-id=165 bgcolor=#E9E9E9
| 583165 ||  || — || March 25, 2007 || Mount Lemmon || Mount Lemmon Survey ||  || align=right | 1.6 km || 
|-id=166 bgcolor=#E9E9E9
| 583166 ||  || — || December 29, 2014 || Haleakala || Pan-STARRS ||  || align=right | 1.9 km || 
|-id=167 bgcolor=#E9E9E9
| 583167 ||  || — || March 31, 2008 || Mount Lemmon || Mount Lemmon Survey ||  || align=right data-sort-value="0.80" | 800 m || 
|-id=168 bgcolor=#E9E9E9
| 583168 ||  || — || March 16, 2012 || Haleakala || Pan-STARRS ||  || align=right data-sort-value="0.97" | 970 m || 
|-id=169 bgcolor=#fefefe
| 583169 ||  || — || October 2, 1994 || Kitt Peak || Spacewatch ||  || align=right data-sort-value="0.69" | 690 m || 
|-id=170 bgcolor=#E9E9E9
| 583170 ||  || — || December 15, 2014 || Mount Lemmon || Mount Lemmon Survey ||  || align=right | 1.0 km || 
|-id=171 bgcolor=#fefefe
| 583171 ||  || — || March 10, 2016 || Haleakala || Pan-STARRS || H || align=right data-sort-value="0.54" | 540 m || 
|-id=172 bgcolor=#E9E9E9
| 583172 ||  || — || May 12, 2012 || Mount Lemmon || Mount Lemmon Survey ||  || align=right | 1.2 km || 
|-id=173 bgcolor=#E9E9E9
| 583173 ||  || — || September 14, 2013 || Mount Lemmon || Mount Lemmon Survey ||  || align=right | 1.4 km || 
|-id=174 bgcolor=#fefefe
| 583174 ||  || — || March 4, 2016 || Haleakala || Pan-STARRS ||  || align=right data-sort-value="0.69" | 690 m || 
|-id=175 bgcolor=#E9E9E9
| 583175 ||  || — || April 20, 2012 || Mount Lemmon || Mount Lemmon Survey ||  || align=right data-sort-value="0.96" | 960 m || 
|-id=176 bgcolor=#E9E9E9
| 583176 ||  || — || August 28, 2003 || Palomar || NEAT ||  || align=right | 2.1 km || 
|-id=177 bgcolor=#E9E9E9
| 583177 ||  || — || September 1, 2013 || Haleakala || Pan-STARRS ||  || align=right data-sort-value="0.80" | 800 m || 
|-id=178 bgcolor=#E9E9E9
| 583178 ||  || — || March 11, 2016 || Mount Lemmon || Mount Lemmon Survey ||  || align=right data-sort-value="0.80" | 800 m || 
|-id=179 bgcolor=#d6d6d6
| 583179 ||  || — || January 26, 2006 || Mount Lemmon || Mount Lemmon Survey ||  || align=right | 1.7 km || 
|-id=180 bgcolor=#E9E9E9
| 583180 ||  || — || April 17, 2012 || Kitt Peak || Spacewatch ||  || align=right data-sort-value="0.98" | 980 m || 
|-id=181 bgcolor=#E9E9E9
| 583181 ||  || — || March 7, 2016 || Haleakala || Pan-STARRS ||  || align=right data-sort-value="0.98" | 980 m || 
|-id=182 bgcolor=#E9E9E9
| 583182 ||  || — || September 15, 2009 || Kitt Peak || Spacewatch ||  || align=right | 1.9 km || 
|-id=183 bgcolor=#E9E9E9
| 583183 ||  || — || December 29, 2014 || Haleakala || Pan-STARRS ||  || align=right | 1.7 km || 
|-id=184 bgcolor=#E9E9E9
| 583184 ||  || — || December 18, 2014 || Haleakala || Pan-STARRS ||  || align=right | 1.0 km || 
|-id=185 bgcolor=#E9E9E9
| 583185 ||  || — || May 13, 2012 || Mount Lemmon || Mount Lemmon Survey ||  || align=right | 1.2 km || 
|-id=186 bgcolor=#fefefe
| 583186 ||  || — || March 1, 2012 || Mount Lemmon || Mount Lemmon Survey ||  || align=right data-sort-value="0.64" | 640 m || 
|-id=187 bgcolor=#fefefe
| 583187 ||  || — || March 10, 2016 || Haleakala || Pan-STARRS ||  || align=right data-sort-value="0.65" | 650 m || 
|-id=188 bgcolor=#E9E9E9
| 583188 ||  || — || April 3, 2008 || Mount Lemmon || Mount Lemmon Survey ||  || align=right data-sort-value="0.85" | 850 m || 
|-id=189 bgcolor=#E9E9E9
| 583189 ||  || — || March 31, 2008 || Mount Lemmon || Mount Lemmon Survey ||  || align=right data-sort-value="0.90" | 900 m || 
|-id=190 bgcolor=#E9E9E9
| 583190 ||  || — || March 6, 2016 || Haleakala || Pan-STARRS ||  || align=right | 1.1 km || 
|-id=191 bgcolor=#E9E9E9
| 583191 ||  || — || January 30, 2011 || Mount Lemmon || Mount Lemmon Survey ||  || align=right | 1.4 km || 
|-id=192 bgcolor=#E9E9E9
| 583192 ||  || — || March 4, 2016 || Haleakala || Pan-STARRS ||  || align=right data-sort-value="0.85" | 850 m || 
|-id=193 bgcolor=#E9E9E9
| 583193 ||  || — || April 19, 2012 || Mount Lemmon || Mount Lemmon Survey ||  || align=right data-sort-value="0.72" | 720 m || 
|-id=194 bgcolor=#E9E9E9
| 583194 ||  || — || September 25, 2013 || Mount Lemmon || Mount Lemmon Survey ||  || align=right | 1.6 km || 
|-id=195 bgcolor=#E9E9E9
| 583195 ||  || — || January 22, 2002 || Kitt Peak || Spacewatch ||  || align=right | 1.1 km || 
|-id=196 bgcolor=#E9E9E9
| 583196 ||  || — || March 4, 2016 || Haleakala || Pan-STARRS ||  || align=right | 1.2 km || 
|-id=197 bgcolor=#E9E9E9
| 583197 ||  || — || January 5, 2006 || Mount Lemmon || Mount Lemmon Survey ||  || align=right | 1.4 km || 
|-id=198 bgcolor=#E9E9E9
| 583198 ||  || — || March 16, 2007 || Kitt Peak || Spacewatch ||  || align=right | 1.4 km || 
|-id=199 bgcolor=#E9E9E9
| 583199 ||  || — || March 9, 2007 || Kitt Peak || Spacewatch ||  || align=right | 1.1 km || 
|-id=200 bgcolor=#E9E9E9
| 583200 ||  || — || February 25, 2007 || Mount Lemmon || Mount Lemmon Survey ||  || align=right | 1.7 km || 
|}

583201–583300 

|-bgcolor=#E9E9E9
| 583201 ||  || — || September 7, 2008 || Mount Lemmon || Mount Lemmon Survey ||  || align=right | 2.3 km || 
|-id=202 bgcolor=#fefefe
| 583202 ||  || — || February 4, 2012 || Haleakala || Pan-STARRS ||  || align=right data-sort-value="0.66" | 660 m || 
|-id=203 bgcolor=#E9E9E9
| 583203 ||  || — || April 15, 2012 || Haleakala || Pan-STARRS ||  || align=right | 1.2 km || 
|-id=204 bgcolor=#E9E9E9
| 583204 ||  || — || March 3, 2016 || Haleakala || Pan-STARRS ||  || align=right data-sort-value="0.94" | 940 m || 
|-id=205 bgcolor=#E9E9E9
| 583205 ||  || — || February 25, 2011 || Mount Lemmon || Mount Lemmon Survey ||  || align=right | 1.7 km || 
|-id=206 bgcolor=#E9E9E9
| 583206 ||  || — || August 12, 2013 || Haleakala || Pan-STARRS ||  || align=right data-sort-value="0.81" | 810 m || 
|-id=207 bgcolor=#E9E9E9
| 583207 ||  || — || October 30, 2014 || Mount Lemmon || Mount Lemmon Survey ||  || align=right data-sort-value="0.81" | 810 m || 
|-id=208 bgcolor=#E9E9E9
| 583208 ||  || — || November 1, 2013 || Mount Lemmon || Mount Lemmon Survey ||  || align=right | 1.3 km || 
|-id=209 bgcolor=#E9E9E9
| 583209 ||  || — || November 9, 2013 || Mount Lemmon || Mount Lemmon Survey ||  || align=right | 1.4 km || 
|-id=210 bgcolor=#E9E9E9
| 583210 ||  || — || February 10, 2011 || Mount Lemmon || Mount Lemmon Survey ||  || align=right data-sort-value="0.93" | 930 m || 
|-id=211 bgcolor=#E9E9E9
| 583211 ||  || — || April 25, 2003 || Kitt Peak || Spacewatch ||  || align=right | 1.3 km || 
|-id=212 bgcolor=#E9E9E9
| 583212 ||  || — || January 4, 2011 || Mount Lemmon || Mount Lemmon Survey ||  || align=right data-sort-value="0.87" | 870 m || 
|-id=213 bgcolor=#E9E9E9
| 583213 ||  || — || February 17, 2007 || Mount Lemmon || Mount Lemmon Survey ||  || align=right data-sort-value="0.95" | 950 m || 
|-id=214 bgcolor=#E9E9E9
| 583214 ||  || — || February 4, 2016 || Flagstaff || L. H. Wasserman ||  || align=right | 1.2 km || 
|-id=215 bgcolor=#fefefe
| 583215 ||  || — || April 2, 2005 || Mount Lemmon || Mount Lemmon Survey ||  || align=right data-sort-value="0.67" | 670 m || 
|-id=216 bgcolor=#E9E9E9
| 583216 ||  || — || January 16, 2015 || Haleakala || Pan-STARRS ||  || align=right | 1.2 km || 
|-id=217 bgcolor=#E9E9E9
| 583217 ||  || — || April 28, 2003 || Anderson Mesa || LONEOS ||  || align=right | 1.7 km || 
|-id=218 bgcolor=#E9E9E9
| 583218 ||  || — || January 28, 2011 || Mount Lemmon || Mount Lemmon Survey ||  || align=right | 1.5 km || 
|-id=219 bgcolor=#E9E9E9
| 583219 ||  || — || March 10, 2016 || Haleakala || Pan-STARRS ||  || align=right | 1.1 km || 
|-id=220 bgcolor=#E9E9E9
| 583220 ||  || — || January 13, 2015 || Haleakala || Pan-STARRS ||  || align=right | 2.0 km || 
|-id=221 bgcolor=#E9E9E9
| 583221 ||  || — || March 11, 2016 || Haleakala || Pan-STARRS ||  || align=right | 1.7 km || 
|-id=222 bgcolor=#E9E9E9
| 583222 ||  || — || September 13, 2013 || Kitt Peak || Spacewatch ||  || align=right | 1.8 km || 
|-id=223 bgcolor=#E9E9E9
| 583223 ||  || — || September 3, 2013 || Calar Alto || F. Hormuth ||  || align=right | 1.9 km || 
|-id=224 bgcolor=#E9E9E9
| 583224 ||  || — || December 26, 2014 || Haleakala || Pan-STARRS ||  || align=right | 1.4 km || 
|-id=225 bgcolor=#E9E9E9
| 583225 ||  || — || March 30, 2008 || Kitt Peak || Spacewatch ||  || align=right data-sort-value="0.77" | 770 m || 
|-id=226 bgcolor=#E9E9E9
| 583226 ||  || — || August 27, 2005 || Palomar || NEAT ||  || align=right | 1.2 km || 
|-id=227 bgcolor=#fefefe
| 583227 ||  || — || September 19, 2014 || Haleakala || Pan-STARRS ||  || align=right data-sort-value="0.59" | 590 m || 
|-id=228 bgcolor=#E9E9E9
| 583228 ||  || — || January 30, 2011 || Haleakala || Pan-STARRS ||  || align=right data-sort-value="0.99" | 990 m || 
|-id=229 bgcolor=#fefefe
| 583229 ||  || — || March 13, 2016 || Haleakala || Pan-STARRS ||  || align=right data-sort-value="0.76" | 760 m || 
|-id=230 bgcolor=#E9E9E9
| 583230 ||  || — || March 4, 2016 || Haleakala || Pan-STARRS ||  || align=right | 1.3 km || 
|-id=231 bgcolor=#E9E9E9
| 583231 ||  || — || March 4, 2016 || Haleakala || Pan-STARRS ||  || align=right | 1.3 km || 
|-id=232 bgcolor=#E9E9E9
| 583232 ||  || — || March 2, 2016 || Haleakala || Pan-STARRS ||  || align=right | 1.4 km || 
|-id=233 bgcolor=#E9E9E9
| 583233 ||  || — || December 5, 2005 || Mount Lemmon || Mount Lemmon Survey ||  || align=right | 1.9 km || 
|-id=234 bgcolor=#E9E9E9
| 583234 ||  || — || March 12, 2016 || Haleakala || Pan-STARRS ||  || align=right | 1.4 km || 
|-id=235 bgcolor=#E9E9E9
| 583235 ||  || — || March 4, 2016 || Haleakala || Pan-STARRS ||  || align=right | 1.5 km || 
|-id=236 bgcolor=#E9E9E9
| 583236 ||  || — || March 4, 2016 || Haleakala || Pan-STARRS ||  || align=right | 2.2 km || 
|-id=237 bgcolor=#E9E9E9
| 583237 ||  || — || March 15, 2016 || Haleakala || Pan-STARRS ||  || align=right | 1.6 km || 
|-id=238 bgcolor=#fefefe
| 583238 ||  || — || March 12, 2016 || Mount Lemmon || Mount Lemmon Survey ||  || align=right data-sort-value="0.52" | 520 m || 
|-id=239 bgcolor=#E9E9E9
| 583239 ||  || — || March 10, 2016 || Haleakala || Pan-STARRS ||  || align=right | 1.2 km || 
|-id=240 bgcolor=#E9E9E9
| 583240 ||  || — || February 7, 2011 || Mount Lemmon || Mount Lemmon Survey ||  || align=right | 1.4 km || 
|-id=241 bgcolor=#d6d6d6
| 583241 ||  || — || December 29, 2014 || Haleakala || Pan-STARRS ||  || align=right | 2.7 km || 
|-id=242 bgcolor=#E9E9E9
| 583242 ||  || — || September 1, 2005 || Kitt Peak || Spacewatch ||  || align=right | 1.1 km || 
|-id=243 bgcolor=#E9E9E9
| 583243 ||  || — || July 12, 2013 || Haleakala || Pan-STARRS ||  || align=right | 1.5 km || 
|-id=244 bgcolor=#E9E9E9
| 583244 ||  || — || February 16, 2007 || Catalina || CSS ||  || align=right | 2.1 km || 
|-id=245 bgcolor=#E9E9E9
| 583245 ||  || — || February 10, 2003 || Kitt Peak || Spacewatch ||  || align=right | 1.5 km || 
|-id=246 bgcolor=#E9E9E9
| 583246 ||  || — || October 7, 2005 || Mount Lemmon || Mount Lemmon Survey ||  || align=right | 1.3 km || 
|-id=247 bgcolor=#E9E9E9
| 583247 ||  || — || April 28, 2012 || Mount Lemmon || Mount Lemmon Survey ||  || align=right | 1.5 km || 
|-id=248 bgcolor=#fefefe
| 583248 ||  || — || March 12, 2008 || Mount Lemmon || Mount Lemmon Survey ||  || align=right | 1.4 km || 
|-id=249 bgcolor=#E9E9E9
| 583249 ||  || — || October 1, 2013 || Mount Lemmon || Mount Lemmon Survey ||  || align=right | 1.3 km || 
|-id=250 bgcolor=#E9E9E9
| 583250 ||  || — || November 26, 2014 || Mount Lemmon || Mount Lemmon Survey ||  || align=right | 2.1 km || 
|-id=251 bgcolor=#E9E9E9
| 583251 ||  || — || May 29, 1995 || Kitt Peak || Spacewatch ||  || align=right | 1.7 km || 
|-id=252 bgcolor=#E9E9E9
| 583252 ||  || — || November 26, 2014 || Mount Lemmon || Mount Lemmon Survey ||  || align=right | 2.2 km || 
|-id=253 bgcolor=#E9E9E9
| 583253 ||  || — || October 23, 2009 || Kitt Peak || Spacewatch ||  || align=right | 1.7 km || 
|-id=254 bgcolor=#E9E9E9
| 583254 ||  || — || May 24, 2000 || Mauna Kea || C. Veillet ||  || align=right data-sort-value="0.76" | 760 m || 
|-id=255 bgcolor=#E9E9E9
| 583255 ||  || — || August 12, 2013 || Haleakala || Pan-STARRS ||  || align=right data-sort-value="0.74" | 740 m || 
|-id=256 bgcolor=#E9E9E9
| 583256 ||  || — || July 17, 2004 || Cerro Tololo || Cerro Tololo Obs. ||  || align=right | 1.5 km || 
|-id=257 bgcolor=#E9E9E9
| 583257 ||  || — || November 20, 2009 || Mount Lemmon || Mount Lemmon Survey ||  || align=right | 1.3 km || 
|-id=258 bgcolor=#E9E9E9
| 583258 ||  || — || April 15, 2008 || Kitt Peak || Spacewatch ||  || align=right data-sort-value="0.96" | 960 m || 
|-id=259 bgcolor=#E9E9E9
| 583259 ||  || — || January 26, 2011 || Kitt Peak || Spacewatch ||  || align=right | 1.9 km || 
|-id=260 bgcolor=#E9E9E9
| 583260 ||  || — || April 16, 2012 || Haleakala || Pan-STARRS ||  || align=right data-sort-value="0.63" | 630 m || 
|-id=261 bgcolor=#E9E9E9
| 583261 ||  || — || March 26, 2007 || Mount Lemmon || Mount Lemmon Survey ||  || align=right | 1.7 km || 
|-id=262 bgcolor=#fefefe
| 583262 ||  || — || March 10, 2016 || Haleakala || Pan-STARRS ||  || align=right data-sort-value="0.75" | 750 m || 
|-id=263 bgcolor=#E9E9E9
| 583263 ||  || — || April 11, 2008 || Mount Lemmon || Mount Lemmon Survey ||  || align=right data-sort-value="0.94" | 940 m || 
|-id=264 bgcolor=#E9E9E9
| 583264 ||  || — || September 20, 2009 || Mount Lemmon || Mount Lemmon Survey ||  || align=right | 1.2 km || 
|-id=265 bgcolor=#E9E9E9
| 583265 ||  || — || May 15, 2012 || Haleakala || Pan-STARRS ||  || align=right | 1.2 km || 
|-id=266 bgcolor=#E9E9E9
| 583266 ||  || — || February 11, 2016 || Haleakala || Pan-STARRS ||  || align=right | 2.2 km || 
|-id=267 bgcolor=#E9E9E9
| 583267 ||  || — || February 10, 2011 || Mount Lemmon || Mount Lemmon Survey ||  || align=right | 1.6 km || 
|-id=268 bgcolor=#E9E9E9
| 583268 ||  || — || December 27, 2005 || Kitt Peak || Spacewatch ||  || align=right | 2.3 km || 
|-id=269 bgcolor=#fefefe
| 583269 ||  || — || December 15, 2007 || Mount Lemmon || Mount Lemmon Survey ||  || align=right data-sort-value="0.72" | 720 m || 
|-id=270 bgcolor=#fefefe
| 583270 ||  || — || January 18, 2009 || Mount Lemmon || Mount Lemmon Survey ||  || align=right data-sort-value="0.65" | 650 m || 
|-id=271 bgcolor=#E9E9E9
| 583271 ||  || — || April 1, 2008 || Mount Lemmon || Mount Lemmon Survey ||  || align=right data-sort-value="0.68" | 680 m || 
|-id=272 bgcolor=#E9E9E9
| 583272 ||  || — || August 9, 2013 || Haleakala || Pan-STARRS ||  || align=right | 1.00 km || 
|-id=273 bgcolor=#fefefe
| 583273 ||  || — || November 24, 2011 || Mount Lemmon || Mount Lemmon Survey ||  || align=right data-sort-value="0.66" | 660 m || 
|-id=274 bgcolor=#E9E9E9
| 583274 ||  || — || September 24, 2013 || Haleakala || Pan-STARRS ||  || align=right | 2.4 km || 
|-id=275 bgcolor=#E9E9E9
| 583275 ||  || — || March 11, 2008 || Kitt Peak || Spacewatch ||  || align=right data-sort-value="0.90" | 900 m || 
|-id=276 bgcolor=#E9E9E9
| 583276 ||  || — || December 24, 2014 || Mount Lemmon || Mount Lemmon Survey ||  || align=right | 3.0 km || 
|-id=277 bgcolor=#E9E9E9
| 583277 ||  || — || July 24, 2003 || Palomar || NEAT ||  || align=right | 2.3 km || 
|-id=278 bgcolor=#E9E9E9
| 583278 ||  || — || March 11, 2007 || Kitt Peak || Spacewatch ||  || align=right data-sort-value="0.89" | 890 m || 
|-id=279 bgcolor=#E9E9E9
| 583279 ||  || — || March 18, 2016 || Haleakala || Pan-STARRS ||  || align=right | 1.5 km || 
|-id=280 bgcolor=#E9E9E9
| 583280 ||  || — || March 16, 2016 || Haleakala || Pan-STARRS ||  || align=right | 1.4 km || 
|-id=281 bgcolor=#E9E9E9
| 583281 ||  || — || December 13, 2010 || Mount Lemmon || Mount Lemmon Survey ||  || align=right | 1.3 km || 
|-id=282 bgcolor=#E9E9E9
| 583282 ||  || — || March 16, 2012 || Kitt Peak || Spacewatch ||  || align=right data-sort-value="0.89" | 890 m || 
|-id=283 bgcolor=#E9E9E9
| 583283 ||  || — || November 6, 2013 || Haleakala || Pan-STARRS ||  || align=right | 1.4 km || 
|-id=284 bgcolor=#E9E9E9
| 583284 ||  || — || June 9, 2012 || Mount Lemmon || Mount Lemmon Survey ||  || align=right data-sort-value="0.95" | 950 m || 
|-id=285 bgcolor=#E9E9E9
| 583285 ||  || — || September 10, 2004 || Kitt Peak || Spacewatch ||  || align=right | 1.4 km || 
|-id=286 bgcolor=#fefefe
| 583286 ||  || — || March 16, 2016 || Haleakala || Pan-STARRS ||  || align=right data-sort-value="0.65" | 650 m || 
|-id=287 bgcolor=#E9E9E9
| 583287 ||  || — || March 17, 2016 || Haleakala || Pan-STARRS ||  || align=right | 2.0 km || 
|-id=288 bgcolor=#E9E9E9
| 583288 ||  || — || March 17, 2016 || Haleakala || Pan-STARRS ||  || align=right | 1.4 km || 
|-id=289 bgcolor=#E9E9E9
| 583289 ||  || — || March 18, 2016 || Mount Lemmon || Mount Lemmon Survey ||  || align=right | 1.6 km || 
|-id=290 bgcolor=#E9E9E9
| 583290 ||  || — || November 29, 2014 || Mount Lemmon || Mount Lemmon Survey ||  || align=right | 1.5 km || 
|-id=291 bgcolor=#fefefe
| 583291 ||  || — || May 13, 2009 || Kitt Peak || Spacewatch ||  || align=right data-sort-value="0.63" | 630 m || 
|-id=292 bgcolor=#E9E9E9
| 583292 ||  || — || April 10, 2008 || Kitt Peak || Spacewatch ||  || align=right | 1.0 km || 
|-id=293 bgcolor=#E9E9E9
| 583293 ||  || — || November 9, 2009 || Mount Lemmon || Mount Lemmon Survey ||  || align=right | 1.9 km || 
|-id=294 bgcolor=#fefefe
| 583294 ||  || — || September 27, 2003 || Kitt Peak || Spacewatch ||  || align=right data-sort-value="0.61" | 610 m || 
|-id=295 bgcolor=#E9E9E9
| 583295 ||  || — || January 2, 2011 || Mount Lemmon || Mount Lemmon Survey ||  || align=right data-sort-value="0.79" | 790 m || 
|-id=296 bgcolor=#E9E9E9
| 583296 ||  || — || March 12, 2011 || Mount Lemmon || Mount Lemmon Survey ||  || align=right | 2.0 km || 
|-id=297 bgcolor=#E9E9E9
| 583297 ||  || — || February 10, 2016 || Haleakala || Pan-STARRS ||  || align=right data-sort-value="0.70" | 700 m || 
|-id=298 bgcolor=#E9E9E9
| 583298 ||  || — || August 8, 2013 || Haleakala || Pan-STARRS ||  || align=right | 1.1 km || 
|-id=299 bgcolor=#E9E9E9
| 583299 ||  || — || October 15, 2009 || Mount Lemmon || Mount Lemmon Survey ||  || align=right | 1.6 km || 
|-id=300 bgcolor=#E9E9E9
| 583300 ||  || — || April 13, 2004 || Kitt Peak || Spacewatch ||  || align=right data-sort-value="0.64" | 640 m || 
|}

583301–583400 

|-bgcolor=#E9E9E9
| 583301 ||  || — || April 21, 2012 || Mount Lemmon || Mount Lemmon Survey ||  || align=right | 1.2 km || 
|-id=302 bgcolor=#fefefe
| 583302 ||  || — || January 19, 2004 || Kitt Peak || Spacewatch ||  || align=right data-sort-value="0.65" | 650 m || 
|-id=303 bgcolor=#E9E9E9
| 583303 ||  || — || April 25, 2004 || Kitt Peak || Spacewatch ||  || align=right data-sort-value="0.87" | 870 m || 
|-id=304 bgcolor=#E9E9E9
| 583304 ||  || — || December 5, 2005 || Mount Lemmon || Mount Lemmon Survey ||  || align=right | 1.3 km || 
|-id=305 bgcolor=#E9E9E9
| 583305 ||  || — || April 15, 2012 || Haleakala || Pan-STARRS ||  || align=right data-sort-value="0.77" | 770 m || 
|-id=306 bgcolor=#E9E9E9
| 583306 ||  || — || September 15, 2009 || Kitt Peak || Spacewatch ||  || align=right | 1.2 km || 
|-id=307 bgcolor=#E9E9E9
| 583307 ||  || — || September 15, 2009 || Kitt Peak || Spacewatch ||  || align=right | 1.6 km || 
|-id=308 bgcolor=#fefefe
| 583308 ||  || — || February 16, 2012 || Haleakala || Pan-STARRS ||  || align=right data-sort-value="0.70" | 700 m || 
|-id=309 bgcolor=#fefefe
| 583309 ||  || — || March 11, 2016 || Haleakala || Pan-STARRS ||  || align=right data-sort-value="0.65" | 650 m || 
|-id=310 bgcolor=#E9E9E9
| 583310 ||  || — || April 8, 2002 || Kitt Peak || Spacewatch ||  || align=right | 1.9 km || 
|-id=311 bgcolor=#E9E9E9
| 583311 ||  || — || May 15, 2012 || Mount Lemmon || Mount Lemmon Survey ||  || align=right | 1.3 km || 
|-id=312 bgcolor=#E9E9E9
| 583312 ||  || — || April 17, 2012 || Kitt Peak || Spacewatch ||  || align=right | 1.2 km || 
|-id=313 bgcolor=#E9E9E9
| 583313 ||  || — || March 13, 2008 || Kitt Peak || Spacewatch ||  || align=right data-sort-value="0.81" | 810 m || 
|-id=314 bgcolor=#E9E9E9
| 583314 ||  || — || April 15, 2012 || Haleakala || Pan-STARRS ||  || align=right data-sort-value="0.82" | 820 m || 
|-id=315 bgcolor=#E9E9E9
| 583315 ||  || — || October 25, 2005 || Kitt Peak || Spacewatch ||  || align=right | 1.2 km || 
|-id=316 bgcolor=#E9E9E9
| 583316 ||  || — || September 20, 2009 || Mount Lemmon || Mount Lemmon Survey ||  || align=right data-sort-value="0.73" | 730 m || 
|-id=317 bgcolor=#d6d6d6
| 583317 ||  || — || September 30, 1995 || Kitt Peak || Spacewatch ||  || align=right | 2.4 km || 
|-id=318 bgcolor=#fefefe
| 583318 ||  || — || October 12, 2010 || Mount Lemmon || Mount Lemmon Survey ||  || align=right data-sort-value="0.75" | 750 m || 
|-id=319 bgcolor=#E9E9E9
| 583319 ||  || — || September 19, 2001 || Kitt Peak || Spacewatch ||  || align=right data-sort-value="0.74" | 740 m || 
|-id=320 bgcolor=#fefefe
| 583320 ||  || — || September 10, 2002 || Haleakala || AMOS ||  || align=right data-sort-value="0.95" | 950 m || 
|-id=321 bgcolor=#E9E9E9
| 583321 ||  || — || July 14, 2013 || Haleakala || Pan-STARRS ||  || align=right data-sort-value="0.71" | 710 m || 
|-id=322 bgcolor=#E9E9E9
| 583322 ||  || — || May 15, 2012 || Haleakala || Pan-STARRS ||  || align=right | 1.2 km || 
|-id=323 bgcolor=#fefefe
| 583323 ||  || — || August 27, 2006 || Kitt Peak || Spacewatch ||  || align=right data-sort-value="0.76" | 760 m || 
|-id=324 bgcolor=#E9E9E9
| 583324 ||  || — || November 10, 2009 || Mount Lemmon || Mount Lemmon Survey ||  || align=right | 1.1 km || 
|-id=325 bgcolor=#d6d6d6
| 583325 ||  || — || September 24, 2008 || Mount Lemmon || Mount Lemmon Survey ||  || align=right | 1.9 km || 
|-id=326 bgcolor=#fefefe
| 583326 ||  || — || March 11, 2008 || Mount Lemmon || Mount Lemmon Survey ||  || align=right data-sort-value="0.82" | 820 m || 
|-id=327 bgcolor=#E9E9E9
| 583327 ||  || — || August 15, 2013 || Haleakala || Pan-STARRS ||  || align=right | 1.0 km || 
|-id=328 bgcolor=#fefefe
| 583328 ||  || — || July 31, 2000 || Cerro Tololo || M. W. Buie, S. D. Kern ||  || align=right data-sort-value="0.53" | 530 m || 
|-id=329 bgcolor=#E9E9E9
| 583329 ||  || — || March 28, 2008 || Mount Lemmon || Mount Lemmon Survey ||  || align=right data-sort-value="0.77" | 770 m || 
|-id=330 bgcolor=#E9E9E9
| 583330 ||  || — || March 1, 2011 || Mount Lemmon || Mount Lemmon Survey ||  || align=right | 1.3 km || 
|-id=331 bgcolor=#fefefe
| 583331 ||  || — || August 9, 2013 || Haleakala || Pan-STARRS ||  || align=right data-sort-value="0.69" | 690 m || 
|-id=332 bgcolor=#fefefe
| 583332 ||  || — || February 10, 2008 || Kitt Peak || Spacewatch ||  || align=right data-sort-value="0.68" | 680 m || 
|-id=333 bgcolor=#E9E9E9
| 583333 ||  || — || April 21, 2012 || Kitt Peak || Spacewatch ||  || align=right data-sort-value="0.66" | 660 m || 
|-id=334 bgcolor=#E9E9E9
| 583334 ||  || — || June 18, 2013 || Haleakala || Pan-STARRS ||  || align=right data-sort-value="0.98" | 980 m || 
|-id=335 bgcolor=#E9E9E9
| 583335 ||  || — || November 18, 1998 || La Palma || D. Davis, S. Howell ||  || align=right data-sort-value="0.69" | 690 m || 
|-id=336 bgcolor=#fefefe
| 583336 ||  || — || January 11, 2008 || Kitt Peak || Spacewatch ||  || align=right data-sort-value="0.62" | 620 m || 
|-id=337 bgcolor=#E9E9E9
| 583337 ||  || — || November 26, 2014 || Haleakala || Pan-STARRS ||  || align=right data-sort-value="0.92" | 920 m || 
|-id=338 bgcolor=#E9E9E9
| 583338 ||  || — || April 20, 2012 || Kitt Peak || Spacewatch ||  || align=right data-sort-value="0.78" | 780 m || 
|-id=339 bgcolor=#E9E9E9
| 583339 ||  || — || February 11, 2016 || Haleakala || Pan-STARRS ||  || align=right | 1.6 km || 
|-id=340 bgcolor=#fefefe
| 583340 ||  || — || July 14, 2013 || Haleakala || Pan-STARRS ||  || align=right data-sort-value="0.85" | 850 m || 
|-id=341 bgcolor=#E9E9E9
| 583341 ||  || — || September 24, 2009 || Mount Lemmon || Mount Lemmon Survey ||  || align=right | 1.9 km || 
|-id=342 bgcolor=#E9E9E9
| 583342 ||  || — || December 27, 2006 || Charleston || R. Holmes ||  || align=right data-sort-value="0.95" | 950 m || 
|-id=343 bgcolor=#E9E9E9
| 583343 ||  || — || April 1, 2016 || Haleakala || Pan-STARRS ||  || align=right | 1.1 km || 
|-id=344 bgcolor=#E9E9E9
| 583344 ||  || — || October 27, 2009 || Kitt Peak || Spacewatch ||  || align=right | 1.7 km || 
|-id=345 bgcolor=#E9E9E9
| 583345 ||  || — || November 11, 2009 || Mount Lemmon || Mount Lemmon Survey ||  || align=right | 1.3 km || 
|-id=346 bgcolor=#fefefe
| 583346 ||  || — || August 9, 2013 || Haleakala || Pan-STARRS ||  || align=right data-sort-value="0.66" | 660 m || 
|-id=347 bgcolor=#E9E9E9
| 583347 ||  || — || February 11, 2016 || Haleakala || Pan-STARRS ||  || align=right | 1.9 km || 
|-id=348 bgcolor=#E9E9E9
| 583348 ||  || — || January 15, 2015 || Haleakala || Pan-STARRS ||  || align=right | 1.7 km || 
|-id=349 bgcolor=#E9E9E9
| 583349 ||  || — || April 20, 2012 || Siding Spring || SSS ||  || align=right | 1.3 km || 
|-id=350 bgcolor=#E9E9E9
| 583350 ||  || — || August 14, 2013 || Haleakala || Pan-STARRS ||  || align=right data-sort-value="0.73" | 730 m || 
|-id=351 bgcolor=#fefefe
| 583351 ||  || — || November 17, 2014 || Haleakala || Pan-STARRS ||  || align=right data-sort-value="0.67" | 670 m || 
|-id=352 bgcolor=#E9E9E9
| 583352 ||  || — || April 21, 2004 || Kitt Peak || Spacewatch ||  || align=right data-sort-value="0.91" | 910 m || 
|-id=353 bgcolor=#E9E9E9
| 583353 ||  || — || April 25, 2012 || Mayhill-ISON || L. Elenin ||  || align=right | 1.3 km || 
|-id=354 bgcolor=#E9E9E9
| 583354 ||  || — || February 25, 2007 || Kitt Peak || Spacewatch ||  || align=right | 1.3 km || 
|-id=355 bgcolor=#E9E9E9
| 583355 ||  || — || March 29, 2016 || Haleakala || Pan-STARRS ||  || align=right | 1.2 km || 
|-id=356 bgcolor=#E9E9E9
| 583356 ||  || — || February 5, 2011 || Mount Lemmon || Mount Lemmon Survey ||  || align=right | 1.8 km || 
|-id=357 bgcolor=#E9E9E9
| 583357 ||  || — || January 28, 2011 || Mount Lemmon || Mount Lemmon Survey ||  || align=right | 1.5 km || 
|-id=358 bgcolor=#fefefe
| 583358 ||  || — || February 1, 1995 || Kitt Peak || Spacewatch ||  || align=right data-sort-value="0.65" | 650 m || 
|-id=359 bgcolor=#E9E9E9
| 583359 ||  || — || March 4, 2016 || Haleakala || Pan-STARRS ||  || align=right | 1.0 km || 
|-id=360 bgcolor=#fefefe
| 583360 ||  || — || November 12, 2007 || Mount Lemmon || Mount Lemmon Survey ||  || align=right | 1.1 km || 
|-id=361 bgcolor=#E9E9E9
| 583361 ||  || — || April 20, 2012 || Mount Lemmon || Mount Lemmon Survey ||  || align=right | 1.4 km || 
|-id=362 bgcolor=#E9E9E9
| 583362 ||  || — || September 24, 2013 || Mount Lemmon || Mount Lemmon Survey ||  || align=right | 2.0 km || 
|-id=363 bgcolor=#E9E9E9
| 583363 ||  || — || October 2, 2013 || Haleakala || Pan-STARRS ||  || align=right | 1.8 km || 
|-id=364 bgcolor=#E9E9E9
| 583364 ||  || — || January 10, 2007 || Kitt Peak || Spacewatch ||  || align=right | 1.3 km || 
|-id=365 bgcolor=#E9E9E9
| 583365 ||  || — || March 11, 2007 || Kitt Peak || Spacewatch ||  || align=right | 1.4 km || 
|-id=366 bgcolor=#E9E9E9
| 583366 ||  || — || February 1, 1995 || Kitt Peak || Spacewatch ||  || align=right data-sort-value="0.83" | 830 m || 
|-id=367 bgcolor=#E9E9E9
| 583367 ||  || — || September 1, 2013 || Mount Lemmon || Mount Lemmon Survey ||  || align=right | 1.6 km || 
|-id=368 bgcolor=#fefefe
| 583368 ||  || — || June 13, 2005 || Mount Lemmon || Mount Lemmon Survey ||  || align=right data-sort-value="0.81" | 810 m || 
|-id=369 bgcolor=#E9E9E9
| 583369 ||  || — || August 20, 2014 || Haleakala || Pan-STARRS ||  || align=right data-sort-value="0.95" | 950 m || 
|-id=370 bgcolor=#E9E9E9
| 583370 ||  || — || April 28, 2008 || Mount Lemmon || Mount Lemmon Survey ||  || align=right data-sort-value="0.89" | 890 m || 
|-id=371 bgcolor=#E9E9E9
| 583371 ||  || — || February 9, 2016 || Haleakala || Pan-STARRS ||  || align=right data-sort-value="0.75" | 750 m || 
|-id=372 bgcolor=#E9E9E9
| 583372 ||  || — || April 25, 2012 || Kitt Peak || Spacewatch ||  || align=right | 1.2 km || 
|-id=373 bgcolor=#E9E9E9
| 583373 ||  || — || April 29, 2008 || Mount Lemmon || Mount Lemmon Survey ||  || align=right data-sort-value="0.77" | 770 m || 
|-id=374 bgcolor=#fefefe
| 583374 ||  || — || February 11, 2008 || Mount Lemmon || Mount Lemmon Survey ||  || align=right data-sort-value="0.80" | 800 m || 
|-id=375 bgcolor=#E9E9E9
| 583375 ||  || — || March 25, 2012 || Kitt Peak || Spacewatch ||  || align=right data-sort-value="0.68" | 680 m || 
|-id=376 bgcolor=#E9E9E9
| 583376 ||  || — || March 14, 2007 || Mount Lemmon || Mount Lemmon Survey ||  || align=right | 2.2 km || 
|-id=377 bgcolor=#E9E9E9
| 583377 ||  || — || August 27, 2009 || Kitt Peak || Spacewatch ||  || align=right data-sort-value="0.83" | 830 m || 
|-id=378 bgcolor=#fefefe
| 583378 ||  || — || November 15, 2010 || Mount Lemmon || Mount Lemmon Survey ||  || align=right data-sort-value="0.83" | 830 m || 
|-id=379 bgcolor=#E9E9E9
| 583379 ||  || — || August 27, 2013 || Haleakala || Pan-STARRS ||  || align=right data-sort-value="0.80" | 800 m || 
|-id=380 bgcolor=#E9E9E9
| 583380 ||  || — || January 18, 2015 || Mount Lemmon || Mount Lemmon Survey ||  || align=right | 1.3 km || 
|-id=381 bgcolor=#E9E9E9
| 583381 ||  || — || March 1, 2011 || Mount Lemmon || Mount Lemmon Survey ||  || align=right | 1.5 km || 
|-id=382 bgcolor=#E9E9E9
| 583382 ||  || — || September 14, 2013 || Haleakala || Pan-STARRS ||  || align=right data-sort-value="0.88" | 880 m || 
|-id=383 bgcolor=#E9E9E9
| 583383 ||  || — || November 23, 2014 || Haleakala || Pan-STARRS ||  || align=right data-sort-value="0.77" | 770 m || 
|-id=384 bgcolor=#E9E9E9
| 583384 ||  || — || April 27, 2012 || Kitt Peak || Spacewatch ||  || align=right | 1.3 km || 
|-id=385 bgcolor=#E9E9E9
| 583385 ||  || — || April 20, 2012 || Mount Lemmon || Mount Lemmon Survey ||  || align=right | 1.2 km || 
|-id=386 bgcolor=#E9E9E9
| 583386 ||  || — || January 14, 2011 || Kitt Peak || Spacewatch ||  || align=right | 1.2 km || 
|-id=387 bgcolor=#E9E9E9
| 583387 ||  || — || April 3, 2016 || Haleakala || Pan-STARRS ||  || align=right | 1.0 km || 
|-id=388 bgcolor=#E9E9E9
| 583388 ||  || — || December 16, 2009 || Mount Lemmon || Mount Lemmon Survey ||  || align=right | 2.7 km || 
|-id=389 bgcolor=#E9E9E9
| 583389 ||  || — || February 13, 2011 || Mount Lemmon || Mount Lemmon Survey ||  || align=right data-sort-value="0.87" | 870 m || 
|-id=390 bgcolor=#E9E9E9
| 583390 ||  || — || May 3, 2008 || Mount Lemmon || Mount Lemmon Survey ||  || align=right data-sort-value="0.90" | 900 m || 
|-id=391 bgcolor=#E9E9E9
| 583391 ||  || — || January 14, 2015 || Haleakala || Pan-STARRS ||  || align=right | 1.7 km || 
|-id=392 bgcolor=#E9E9E9
| 583392 ||  || — || December 21, 2014 || Mount Lemmon || Mount Lemmon Survey ||  || align=right | 2.0 km || 
|-id=393 bgcolor=#E9E9E9
| 583393 ||  || — || May 20, 2012 || Mount Lemmon || Mount Lemmon Survey ||  || align=right | 1.2 km || 
|-id=394 bgcolor=#E9E9E9
| 583394 ||  || — || December 1, 2005 || Kitt Peak || L. H. Wasserman, R. Millis ||  || align=right | 1.7 km || 
|-id=395 bgcolor=#fefefe
| 583395 ||  || — || July 13, 2013 || Haleakala || Pan-STARRS ||  || align=right data-sort-value="0.77" | 770 m || 
|-id=396 bgcolor=#E9E9E9
| 583396 ||  || — || January 21, 2015 || Haleakala || Pan-STARRS ||  || align=right | 1.3 km || 
|-id=397 bgcolor=#E9E9E9
| 583397 ||  || — || April 27, 2008 || Kitt Peak || Spacewatch ||  || align=right data-sort-value="0.81" | 810 m || 
|-id=398 bgcolor=#E9E9E9
| 583398 ||  || — || April 3, 2016 || Haleakala || Pan-STARRS ||  || align=right | 1.6 km || 
|-id=399 bgcolor=#E9E9E9
| 583399 ||  || — || April 25, 2008 || Kitt Peak || Spacewatch ||  || align=right | 1.0 km || 
|-id=400 bgcolor=#E9E9E9
| 583400 ||  || — || February 11, 2016 || Haleakala || Pan-STARRS ||  || align=right data-sort-value="0.80" | 800 m || 
|}

583401–583500 

|-bgcolor=#E9E9E9
| 583401 ||  || — || February 11, 2016 || Mount Lemmon || Mount Lemmon Survey ||  || align=right | 1.3 km || 
|-id=402 bgcolor=#E9E9E9
| 583402 ||  || — || February 11, 2016 || Haleakala || Pan-STARRS ||  || align=right | 1.9 km || 
|-id=403 bgcolor=#E9E9E9
| 583403 ||  || — || December 28, 2014 || Mount Lemmon || Mount Lemmon Survey ||  || align=right | 2.0 km || 
|-id=404 bgcolor=#fefefe
| 583404 ||  || — || May 23, 2003 || Kitt Peak || Spacewatch ||  || align=right data-sort-value="0.46" | 460 m || 
|-id=405 bgcolor=#E9E9E9
| 583405 ||  || — || February 8, 2011 || Mount Lemmon || Mount Lemmon Survey ||  || align=right | 1.3 km || 
|-id=406 bgcolor=#fefefe
| 583406 ||  || — || March 15, 2016 || Haleakala || Pan-STARRS ||  || align=right data-sort-value="0.86" | 860 m || 
|-id=407 bgcolor=#E9E9E9
| 583407 ||  || — || January 13, 2015 || Haleakala || Pan-STARRS ||  || align=right | 1.7 km || 
|-id=408 bgcolor=#E9E9E9
| 583408 ||  || — || April 3, 2016 || Haleakala || Pan-STARRS ||  || align=right | 1.8 km || 
|-id=409 bgcolor=#E9E9E9
| 583409 ||  || — || January 26, 2015 || Haleakala || Pan-STARRS || GEF || align=right data-sort-value="0.94" | 940 m || 
|-id=410 bgcolor=#E9E9E9
| 583410 ||  || — || April 18, 2007 || Kitt Peak || Spacewatch ||  || align=right | 1.8 km || 
|-id=411 bgcolor=#E9E9E9
| 583411 ||  || — || March 15, 2008 || Mount Lemmon || Mount Lemmon Survey ||  || align=right | 1.3 km || 
|-id=412 bgcolor=#E9E9E9
| 583412 ||  || — || February 17, 2007 || Mount Lemmon || Mount Lemmon Survey ||  || align=right | 1.5 km || 
|-id=413 bgcolor=#E9E9E9
| 583413 ||  || — || March 29, 2008 || Kitt Peak || Spacewatch ||  || align=right data-sort-value="0.89" | 890 m || 
|-id=414 bgcolor=#E9E9E9
| 583414 ||  || — || August 29, 2013 || Haleakala || Pan-STARRS ||  || align=right | 1.5 km || 
|-id=415 bgcolor=#E9E9E9
| 583415 ||  || — || January 28, 2011 || Mount Lemmon || Mount Lemmon Survey ||  || align=right | 1.7 km || 
|-id=416 bgcolor=#E9E9E9
| 583416 ||  || — || March 23, 2003 || Apache Point || SDSS Collaboration ||  || align=right | 1.3 km || 
|-id=417 bgcolor=#fefefe
| 583417 ||  || — || December 19, 2007 || Mount Lemmon || Mount Lemmon Survey ||  || align=right data-sort-value="0.91" | 910 m || 
|-id=418 bgcolor=#fefefe
| 583418 ||  || — || July 24, 2007 || Mauna Kea || Mauna Kea Obs. ||  || align=right data-sort-value="0.51" | 510 m || 
|-id=419 bgcolor=#E9E9E9
| 583419 ||  || — || February 5, 2016 || Haleakala || Pan-STARRS ||  || align=right | 1.3 km || 
|-id=420 bgcolor=#E9E9E9
| 583420 ||  || — || March 15, 2007 || Mount Lemmon || Mount Lemmon Survey ||  || align=right | 1.5 km || 
|-id=421 bgcolor=#E9E9E9
| 583421 ||  || — || February 10, 2007 || Mount Lemmon || Mount Lemmon Survey ||  || align=right | 1.5 km || 
|-id=422 bgcolor=#E9E9E9
| 583422 ||  || — || April 7, 2016 || Elena Remote || A. Oreshko ||  || align=right | 1.5 km || 
|-id=423 bgcolor=#E9E9E9
| 583423 ||  || — || September 16, 2009 || Mount Lemmon || Mount Lemmon Survey ||  || align=right | 1.7 km || 
|-id=424 bgcolor=#E9E9E9
| 583424 ||  || — || November 3, 2000 || Kitt Peak || Spacewatch ||  || align=right | 1.5 km || 
|-id=425 bgcolor=#E9E9E9
| 583425 ||  || — || January 17, 2007 || Kitt Peak || Spacewatch ||  || align=right | 1.0 km || 
|-id=426 bgcolor=#E9E9E9
| 583426 ||  || — || November 10, 2014 || Haleakala || Pan-STARRS ||  || align=right | 1.6 km || 
|-id=427 bgcolor=#E9E9E9
| 583427 ||  || — || March 11, 2016 || Haleakala || Pan-STARRS ||  || align=right data-sort-value="0.93" | 930 m || 
|-id=428 bgcolor=#E9E9E9
| 583428 ||  || — || August 22, 2004 || Kitt Peak || Spacewatch ||  || align=right | 1.5 km || 
|-id=429 bgcolor=#E9E9E9
| 583429 ||  || — || March 11, 2003 || Palomar || NEAT ||  || align=right | 1.4 km || 
|-id=430 bgcolor=#E9E9E9
| 583430 ||  || — || March 5, 2016 || Haleakala || Pan-STARRS ||  || align=right | 1.8 km || 
|-id=431 bgcolor=#d6d6d6
| 583431 ||  || — || December 20, 2004 || Mount Lemmon || Mount Lemmon Survey ||  || align=right | 2.4 km || 
|-id=432 bgcolor=#E9E9E9
| 583432 ||  || — || March 16, 2016 || Haleakala || Pan-STARRS ||  || align=right data-sort-value="0.94" | 940 m || 
|-id=433 bgcolor=#E9E9E9
| 583433 ||  || — || September 15, 2004 || Kitt Peak || Spacewatch ||  || align=right | 2.4 km || 
|-id=434 bgcolor=#E9E9E9
| 583434 ||  || — || August 11, 2012 || Siding Spring || SSS ||  || align=right | 1.7 km || 
|-id=435 bgcolor=#E9E9E9
| 583435 ||  || — || May 2, 2008 || Mount Lemmon || Mount Lemmon Survey ||  || align=right | 1.0 km || 
|-id=436 bgcolor=#d6d6d6
| 583436 ||  || — || September 25, 2006 || Mount Lemmon || Mount Lemmon Survey ||  || align=right | 2.8 km || 
|-id=437 bgcolor=#E9E9E9
| 583437 ||  || — || May 15, 2012 || Haleakala || Pan-STARRS ||  || align=right | 1.2 km || 
|-id=438 bgcolor=#d6d6d6
| 583438 ||  || — || April 1, 2006 || Eskridge || G. Hug || BRA || align=right | 1.3 km || 
|-id=439 bgcolor=#E9E9E9
| 583439 ||  || — || August 12, 2012 || Siding Spring || SSS ||  || align=right | 1.3 km || 
|-id=440 bgcolor=#E9E9E9
| 583440 ||  || — || April 14, 2016 || Haleakala || Pan-STARRS ||  || align=right data-sort-value="0.78" | 780 m || 
|-id=441 bgcolor=#fefefe
| 583441 ||  || — || July 25, 2006 || Mount Lemmon || Mount Lemmon Survey ||  || align=right data-sort-value="0.82" | 820 m || 
|-id=442 bgcolor=#E9E9E9
| 583442 ||  || — || March 15, 2016 || Haleakala || Pan-STARRS ||  || align=right | 1.3 km || 
|-id=443 bgcolor=#E9E9E9
| 583443 ||  || — || May 10, 2003 || Kitt Peak || Spacewatch ||  || align=right | 1.9 km || 
|-id=444 bgcolor=#E9E9E9
| 583444 ||  || — || April 14, 2016 || Haleakala || Pan-STARRS ||  || align=right | 1.3 km || 
|-id=445 bgcolor=#E9E9E9
| 583445 ||  || — || April 14, 2016 || Haleakala || Pan-STARRS ||  || align=right | 2.0 km || 
|-id=446 bgcolor=#E9E9E9
| 583446 ||  || — || October 27, 2013 || Kitt Peak || Spacewatch ||  || align=right data-sort-value="0.94" | 940 m || 
|-id=447 bgcolor=#E9E9E9
| 583447 ||  || — || September 28, 2003 || Anderson Mesa || LONEOS ||  || align=right | 2.0 km || 
|-id=448 bgcolor=#E9E9E9
| 583448 ||  || — || February 25, 2011 || Mount Lemmon || Mount Lemmon Survey ||  || align=right | 1.3 km || 
|-id=449 bgcolor=#E9E9E9
| 583449 ||  || — || February 9, 2002 || Kitt Peak || Spacewatch ||  || align=right | 1.3 km || 
|-id=450 bgcolor=#E9E9E9
| 583450 ||  || — || March 9, 2003 || Anderson Mesa || LONEOS ||  || align=right | 1.6 km || 
|-id=451 bgcolor=#E9E9E9
| 583451 ||  || — || February 13, 2015 || Mount Lemmon || Mount Lemmon Survey ||  || align=right | 1.8 km || 
|-id=452 bgcolor=#E9E9E9
| 583452 ||  || — || May 18, 2012 || Mount Lemmon || Mount Lemmon Survey || EUN || align=right data-sort-value="0.85" | 850 m || 
|-id=453 bgcolor=#E9E9E9
| 583453 ||  || — || December 20, 2014 || Haleakala || Pan-STARRS ||  || align=right | 1.3 km || 
|-id=454 bgcolor=#E9E9E9
| 583454 ||  || — || July 28, 2005 || Palomar || NEAT ||  || align=right | 1.1 km || 
|-id=455 bgcolor=#E9E9E9
| 583455 ||  || — || May 28, 2012 || Mount Lemmon || Mount Lemmon Survey ||  || align=right | 1.3 km || 
|-id=456 bgcolor=#E9E9E9
| 583456 ||  || — || February 27, 2007 || Kitt Peak || Spacewatch ||  || align=right | 2.0 km || 
|-id=457 bgcolor=#E9E9E9
| 583457 ||  || — || June 16, 2012 || Mount Lemmon || Mount Lemmon Survey ||  || align=right | 1.5 km || 
|-id=458 bgcolor=#E9E9E9
| 583458 ||  || — || September 9, 2013 || Haleakala || Pan-STARRS ||  || align=right | 1.2 km || 
|-id=459 bgcolor=#E9E9E9
| 583459 ||  || — || April 11, 1999 || Kitt Peak || Spacewatch ||  || align=right | 1.6 km || 
|-id=460 bgcolor=#fefefe
| 583460 ||  || — || January 2, 2012 || Mount Lemmon || Mount Lemmon Survey ||  || align=right data-sort-value="0.58" | 580 m || 
|-id=461 bgcolor=#E9E9E9
| 583461 ||  || — || April 29, 2008 || Kitt Peak || Spacewatch ||  || align=right data-sort-value="0.71" | 710 m || 
|-id=462 bgcolor=#E9E9E9
| 583462 ||  || — || January 22, 2006 || Mount Lemmon || Mount Lemmon Survey ||  || align=right | 1.7 km || 
|-id=463 bgcolor=#E9E9E9
| 583463 ||  || — || August 26, 2000 || Cerro Tololo || R. Millis, L. H. Wasserman || MIS || align=right | 1.8 km || 
|-id=464 bgcolor=#E9E9E9
| 583464 ||  || — || February 21, 2003 || Palomar || NEAT ||  || align=right | 1.5 km || 
|-id=465 bgcolor=#fefefe
| 583465 ||  || — || November 4, 2014 || Mount Lemmon || Mount Lemmon Survey ||  || align=right | 1.2 km || 
|-id=466 bgcolor=#E9E9E9
| 583466 ||  || — || October 16, 2001 || Palomar || NEAT ||  || align=right | 1.8 km || 
|-id=467 bgcolor=#E9E9E9
| 583467 ||  || — || October 30, 2005 || Mount Lemmon || Mount Lemmon Survey ||  || align=right | 1.1 km || 
|-id=468 bgcolor=#E9E9E9
| 583468 ||  || — || March 4, 2016 || Haleakala || Pan-STARRS ||  || align=right data-sort-value="0.80" | 800 m || 
|-id=469 bgcolor=#E9E9E9
| 583469 ||  || — || April 3, 2016 || Haleakala || Pan-STARRS ||  || align=right | 1.1 km || 
|-id=470 bgcolor=#fefefe
| 583470 ||  || — || April 15, 2016 || Haleakala || Pan-STARRS ||  || align=right | 1.1 km || 
|-id=471 bgcolor=#E9E9E9
| 583471 ||  || — || November 12, 2005 || Kitt Peak || Spacewatch ||  || align=right | 1.3 km || 
|-id=472 bgcolor=#E9E9E9
| 583472 ||  || — || April 5, 2016 || Haleakala || Pan-STARRS ||  || align=right | 1.1 km || 
|-id=473 bgcolor=#fefefe
| 583473 ||  || — || April 5, 2016 || Haleakala || Pan-STARRS ||  || align=right data-sort-value="0.62" | 620 m || 
|-id=474 bgcolor=#E9E9E9
| 583474 ||  || — || April 15, 2016 || Haleakala || Pan-STARRS ||  || align=right | 1.2 km || 
|-id=475 bgcolor=#E9E9E9
| 583475 ||  || — || April 20, 2004 || Kitt Peak || Spacewatch ||  || align=right data-sort-value="0.98" | 980 m || 
|-id=476 bgcolor=#E9E9E9
| 583476 ||  || — || March 15, 2007 || Mount Lemmon || Mount Lemmon Survey ||  || align=right | 1.3 km || 
|-id=477 bgcolor=#E9E9E9
| 583477 ||  || — || November 17, 2009 || Mount Lemmon || Mount Lemmon Survey ||  || align=right | 1.2 km || 
|-id=478 bgcolor=#E9E9E9
| 583478 ||  || — || April 2, 2016 || Haleakala || Pan-STARRS ||  || align=right data-sort-value="0.88" | 880 m || 
|-id=479 bgcolor=#E9E9E9
| 583479 ||  || — || April 24, 2012 || Mount Lemmon || Mount Lemmon Survey ||  || align=right | 1.2 km || 
|-id=480 bgcolor=#E9E9E9
| 583480 ||  || — || April 1, 2016 || Haleakala || Pan-STARRS ||  || align=right | 1.6 km || 
|-id=481 bgcolor=#E9E9E9
| 583481 ||  || — || December 3, 2014 || Haleakala || Pan-STARRS ||  || align=right | 1.0 km || 
|-id=482 bgcolor=#E9E9E9
| 583482 ||  || — || September 3, 2013 || Haleakala || Pan-STARRS ||  || align=right data-sort-value="0.73" | 730 m || 
|-id=483 bgcolor=#E9E9E9
| 583483 ||  || — || February 25, 2011 || Kitt Peak || Spacewatch ||  || align=right | 1.5 km || 
|-id=484 bgcolor=#E9E9E9
| 583484 ||  || — || April 22, 2007 || Mount Lemmon || Mount Lemmon Survey ||  || align=right | 1.7 km || 
|-id=485 bgcolor=#E9E9E9
| 583485 ||  || — || April 19, 2012 || Mount Lemmon || Mount Lemmon Survey ||  || align=right data-sort-value="0.90" | 900 m || 
|-id=486 bgcolor=#E9E9E9
| 583486 ||  || — || April 25, 2012 || Mount Lemmon || Mount Lemmon Survey ||  || align=right data-sort-value="0.90" | 900 m || 
|-id=487 bgcolor=#E9E9E9
| 583487 ||  || — || May 12, 2012 || Haleakala || Pan-STARRS ||  || align=right | 1.3 km || 
|-id=488 bgcolor=#E9E9E9
| 583488 ||  || — || January 25, 2015 || Haleakala || Pan-STARRS ||  || align=right data-sort-value="0.91" | 910 m || 
|-id=489 bgcolor=#E9E9E9
| 583489 ||  || — || April 11, 2016 || Haleakala || Pan-STARRS ||  || align=right | 1.8 km || 
|-id=490 bgcolor=#E9E9E9
| 583490 ||  || — || November 21, 2014 || Haleakala || Pan-STARRS ||  || align=right | 1.2 km || 
|-id=491 bgcolor=#E9E9E9
| 583491 ||  || — || March 11, 2011 || Kitt Peak || Spacewatch ||  || align=right | 2.1 km || 
|-id=492 bgcolor=#E9E9E9
| 583492 ||  || — || January 14, 2015 || Haleakala || Pan-STARRS ||  || align=right data-sort-value="0.80" | 800 m || 
|-id=493 bgcolor=#E9E9E9
| 583493 ||  || — || July 25, 2008 || Mount Lemmon || Mount Lemmon Survey ||  || align=right | 1.5 km || 
|-id=494 bgcolor=#E9E9E9
| 583494 ||  || — || April 3, 2016 || Haleakala || Pan-STARRS ||  || align=right | 1.0 km || 
|-id=495 bgcolor=#d6d6d6
| 583495 ||  || — || April 10, 2016 || Haleakala || Pan-STARRS ||  || align=right | 3.1 km || 
|-id=496 bgcolor=#E9E9E9
| 583496 ||  || — || April 1, 2016 || Haleakala || Pan-STARRS ||  || align=right data-sort-value="0.83" | 830 m || 
|-id=497 bgcolor=#E9E9E9
| 583497 ||  || — || April 11, 2016 || Haleakala || Pan-STARRS ||  || align=right | 1.3 km || 
|-id=498 bgcolor=#E9E9E9
| 583498 ||  || — || April 14, 2016 || Haleakala || Pan-STARRS ||  || align=right | 1.2 km || 
|-id=499 bgcolor=#E9E9E9
| 583499 ||  || — || January 16, 2015 || Haleakala || Pan-STARRS ||  || align=right | 1.6 km || 
|-id=500 bgcolor=#E9E9E9
| 583500 ||  || — || April 4, 2016 || Haleakala || Pan-STARRS ||  || align=right | 1.2 km || 
|}

583501–583600 

|-bgcolor=#E9E9E9
| 583501 ||  || — || April 5, 2016 || Haleakala || Pan-STARRS ||  || align=right data-sort-value="0.85" | 850 m || 
|-id=502 bgcolor=#E9E9E9
| 583502 ||  || — || April 4, 2016 || Haleakala || Pan-STARRS ||  || align=right data-sort-value="0.96" | 960 m || 
|-id=503 bgcolor=#E9E9E9
| 583503 ||  || — || April 15, 2016 || Mount Lemmon || Mount Lemmon Survey ||  || align=right | 1.5 km || 
|-id=504 bgcolor=#d6d6d6
| 583504 ||  || — || April 4, 2016 || Mount Lemmon || Mount Lemmon Survey ||  || align=right | 2.5 km || 
|-id=505 bgcolor=#d6d6d6
| 583505 ||  || — || December 29, 2014 || Haleakala || Pan-STARRS ||  || align=right | 1.8 km || 
|-id=506 bgcolor=#E9E9E9
| 583506 ||  || — || March 16, 2016 || Haleakala || Pan-STARRS ||  || align=right | 1.2 km || 
|-id=507 bgcolor=#E9E9E9
| 583507 ||  || — || August 28, 2005 || Kitt Peak || Spacewatch ||  || align=right | 1.6 km || 
|-id=508 bgcolor=#E9E9E9
| 583508 ||  || — || March 11, 2016 || Haleakala || Pan-STARRS ||  || align=right | 1.0 km || 
|-id=509 bgcolor=#E9E9E9
| 583509 ||  || — || May 12, 2012 || Mount Lemmon || Mount Lemmon Survey ||  || align=right | 1.1 km || 
|-id=510 bgcolor=#E9E9E9
| 583510 ||  || — || March 9, 2003 || Palomar || NEAT ||  || align=right | 1.8 km || 
|-id=511 bgcolor=#E9E9E9
| 583511 ||  || — || February 14, 2016 || Haleakala || Pan-STARRS ||  || align=right | 1.0 km || 
|-id=512 bgcolor=#E9E9E9
| 583512 ||  || — || April 27, 2016 || Mount Lemmon || Mount Lemmon Survey ||  || align=right | 2.7 km || 
|-id=513 bgcolor=#E9E9E9
| 583513 ||  || — || March 13, 2016 || Haleakala || Pan-STARRS ||  || align=right | 1.3 km || 
|-id=514 bgcolor=#E9E9E9
| 583514 ||  || — || December 23, 2014 || Mount Lemmon || Mount Lemmon Survey ||  || align=right data-sort-value="0.76" | 760 m || 
|-id=515 bgcolor=#E9E9E9
| 583515 ||  || — || August 21, 2008 || Kitt Peak || Spacewatch ||  || align=right | 1.4 km || 
|-id=516 bgcolor=#E9E9E9
| 583516 ||  || — || April 14, 2007 || Kitt Peak || Spacewatch ||  || align=right | 2.3 km || 
|-id=517 bgcolor=#E9E9E9
| 583517 ||  || — || March 13, 2011 || Mount Lemmon || Mount Lemmon Survey ||  || align=right | 1.6 km || 
|-id=518 bgcolor=#E9E9E9
| 583518 ||  || — || October 15, 2004 || Mount Lemmon || Mount Lemmon Survey ||  || align=right | 2.1 km || 
|-id=519 bgcolor=#E9E9E9
| 583519 ||  || — || December 26, 2014 || Haleakala || Pan-STARRS ||  || align=right | 1.7 km || 
|-id=520 bgcolor=#E9E9E9
| 583520 ||  || — || October 3, 2013 || Haleakala || Pan-STARRS ||  || align=right | 1.4 km || 
|-id=521 bgcolor=#E9E9E9
| 583521 ||  || — || September 24, 1995 || Kitt Peak || Spacewatch ||  || align=right | 2.1 km || 
|-id=522 bgcolor=#E9E9E9
| 583522 ||  || — || October 1, 2005 || Mount Lemmon || Mount Lemmon Survey ||  || align=right | 1.0 km || 
|-id=523 bgcolor=#E9E9E9
| 583523 ||  || — || April 30, 2016 || Haleakala || Pan-STARRS ||  || align=right | 1.5 km || 
|-id=524 bgcolor=#E9E9E9
| 583524 ||  || — || October 18, 2009 || Mount Lemmon || Mount Lemmon Survey ||  || align=right data-sort-value="0.94" | 940 m || 
|-id=525 bgcolor=#E9E9E9
| 583525 ||  || — || January 30, 2011 || Mount Lemmon || Mount Lemmon Survey ||  || align=right | 1.2 km || 
|-id=526 bgcolor=#E9E9E9
| 583526 ||  || — || January 16, 2015 || Haleakala || Pan-STARRS ||  || align=right | 1.7 km || 
|-id=527 bgcolor=#E9E9E9
| 583527 ||  || — || November 17, 2014 || Haleakala || Pan-STARRS ||  || align=right | 1.0 km || 
|-id=528 bgcolor=#E9E9E9
| 583528 ||  || — || August 13, 2008 || La Sagra || OAM Obs. ||  || align=right | 1.7 km || 
|-id=529 bgcolor=#fefefe
| 583529 ||  || — || June 1, 2013 || Haleakala || Pan-STARRS ||  || align=right data-sort-value="0.57" | 570 m || 
|-id=530 bgcolor=#E9E9E9
| 583530 ||  || — || October 26, 2009 || Kitt Peak || Spacewatch ||  || align=right | 1.6 km || 
|-id=531 bgcolor=#fefefe
| 583531 ||  || — || July 1, 2013 || Haleakala || Pan-STARRS ||  || align=right data-sort-value="0.74" | 740 m || 
|-id=532 bgcolor=#E9E9E9
| 583532 ||  || — || September 13, 2004 || Palomar || NEAT ||  || align=right | 2.3 km || 
|-id=533 bgcolor=#fefefe
| 583533 ||  || — || February 2, 2013 || Haleakala || Pan-STARRS || H || align=right data-sort-value="0.68" | 680 m || 
|-id=534 bgcolor=#E9E9E9
| 583534 ||  || — || September 1, 2005 || Palomar || NEAT ||  || align=right | 1.6 km || 
|-id=535 bgcolor=#E9E9E9
| 583535 ||  || — || April 28, 2016 || Mount Lemmon || Mount Lemmon Survey ||  || align=right | 1.2 km || 
|-id=536 bgcolor=#E9E9E9
| 583536 ||  || — || April 27, 2016 || Haleakala || Pan-STARRS ||  || align=right | 1.2 km || 
|-id=537 bgcolor=#d6d6d6
| 583537 ||  || — || January 14, 2015 || Haleakala || Pan-STARRS ||  || align=right | 2.2 km || 
|-id=538 bgcolor=#E9E9E9
| 583538 ||  || — || March 31, 2016 || Haleakala || Pan-STARRS ||  || align=right | 1.8 km || 
|-id=539 bgcolor=#E9E9E9
| 583539 ||  || — || January 17, 2015 || Haleakala || Pan-STARRS ||  || align=right | 1.2 km || 
|-id=540 bgcolor=#E9E9E9
| 583540 ||  || — || March 7, 2016 || Haleakala || Pan-STARRS ||  || align=right | 1.1 km || 
|-id=541 bgcolor=#E9E9E9
| 583541 ||  || — || March 6, 2016 || Haleakala || Pan-STARRS ||  || align=right | 1.3 km || 
|-id=542 bgcolor=#E9E9E9
| 583542 ||  || — || May 21, 2012 || Mount Lemmon || Mount Lemmon Survey ||  || align=right | 1.8 km || 
|-id=543 bgcolor=#E9E9E9
| 583543 ||  || — || December 26, 2014 || Haleakala || Pan-STARRS ||  || align=right | 2.0 km || 
|-id=544 bgcolor=#E9E9E9
| 583544 ||  || — || March 9, 2011 || Mount Lemmon || Mount Lemmon Survey ||  || align=right | 1.7 km || 
|-id=545 bgcolor=#E9E9E9
| 583545 ||  || — || March 6, 2011 || Mount Lemmon || Mount Lemmon Survey ||  || align=right | 1.7 km || 
|-id=546 bgcolor=#fefefe
| 583546 ||  || — || April 22, 2011 || Haleakala || Pan-STARRS || H || align=right data-sort-value="0.66" | 660 m || 
|-id=547 bgcolor=#E9E9E9
| 583547 ||  || — || December 26, 2014 || Haleakala || Pan-STARRS ||  || align=right | 1.4 km || 
|-id=548 bgcolor=#E9E9E9
| 583548 ||  || — || July 29, 2008 || Kitt Peak || Spacewatch ||  || align=right | 1.4 km || 
|-id=549 bgcolor=#E9E9E9
| 583549 ||  || — || April 24, 2003 || Bergisch Gladbach || W. Bickel ||  || align=right | 1.5 km || 
|-id=550 bgcolor=#d6d6d6
| 583550 ||  || — || October 24, 2013 || Mount Lemmon || Mount Lemmon Survey ||  || align=right | 2.3 km || 
|-id=551 bgcolor=#E9E9E9
| 583551 ||  || — || June 25, 2003 || Palomar || NEAT ||  || align=right | 2.0 km || 
|-id=552 bgcolor=#E9E9E9
| 583552 ||  || — || March 6, 2016 || Haleakala || Pan-STARRS ||  || align=right | 1.4 km || 
|-id=553 bgcolor=#fefefe
| 583553 ||  || — || May 4, 2009 || Mount Lemmon || Mount Lemmon Survey ||  || align=right data-sort-value="0.65" | 650 m || 
|-id=554 bgcolor=#E9E9E9
| 583554 ||  || — || April 18, 2007 || Mount Lemmon || Mount Lemmon Survey ||  || align=right | 1.3 km || 
|-id=555 bgcolor=#fefefe
| 583555 ||  || — || January 14, 2012 || Les Engarouines || L. Bernasconi ||  || align=right data-sort-value="0.54" | 540 m || 
|-id=556 bgcolor=#C2FFFF
| 583556 ||  || — || October 30, 2010 || Kitt Peak || Spacewatch || L4 || align=right | 7.9 km || 
|-id=557 bgcolor=#E9E9E9
| 583557 ||  || — || October 7, 1996 || Kitt Peak || Spacewatch ||  || align=right | 1.7 km || 
|-id=558 bgcolor=#E9E9E9
| 583558 ||  || — || March 13, 2007 || Mount Lemmon || Mount Lemmon Survey ||  || align=right | 1.3 km || 
|-id=559 bgcolor=#FA8072
| 583559 ||  || — || November 22, 2014 || Mount Lemmon || Mount Lemmon Survey || H || align=right data-sort-value="0.40" | 400 m || 
|-id=560 bgcolor=#E9E9E9
| 583560 ||  || — || December 4, 2005 || Kitt Peak || Spacewatch ||  || align=right | 1.1 km || 
|-id=561 bgcolor=#E9E9E9
| 583561 ||  || — || July 16, 2013 || Haleakala || Pan-STARRS ||  || align=right | 1.9 km || 
|-id=562 bgcolor=#E9E9E9
| 583562 ||  || — || November 17, 2014 || Haleakala || Pan-STARRS ||  || align=right | 1.1 km || 
|-id=563 bgcolor=#E9E9E9
| 583563 ||  || — || December 29, 2014 || Haleakala || Pan-STARRS ||  || align=right | 2.8 km || 
|-id=564 bgcolor=#fefefe
| 583564 ||  || — || April 8, 2008 || Mount Lemmon || Mount Lemmon Survey ||  || align=right data-sort-value="0.86" | 860 m || 
|-id=565 bgcolor=#fefefe
| 583565 ||  || — || February 27, 2009 || Kitt Peak || Spacewatch ||  || align=right data-sort-value="0.53" | 530 m || 
|-id=566 bgcolor=#E9E9E9
| 583566 ||  || — || March 3, 2003 || Palomar || NEAT ||  || align=right | 1.3 km || 
|-id=567 bgcolor=#E9E9E9
| 583567 ||  || — || July 28, 2005 || Palomar || NEAT ||  || align=right | 2.1 km || 
|-id=568 bgcolor=#E9E9E9
| 583568 ||  || — || February 12, 2016 || Haleakala || Pan-STARRS ||  || align=right | 1.1 km || 
|-id=569 bgcolor=#E9E9E9
| 583569 ||  || — || November 29, 2014 || Mount Lemmon || Mount Lemmon Survey ||  || align=right | 1.9 km || 
|-id=570 bgcolor=#E9E9E9
| 583570 ||  || — || May 29, 2003 || Kitt Peak || Spacewatch ||  || align=right | 2.0 km || 
|-id=571 bgcolor=#E9E9E9
| 583571 ||  || — || March 26, 2003 || Kitt Peak || Spacewatch ||  || align=right | 1.3 km || 
|-id=572 bgcolor=#E9E9E9
| 583572 ||  || — || June 7, 2008 || Catalina || CSS ||  || align=right | 2.1 km || 
|-id=573 bgcolor=#E9E9E9
| 583573 ||  || — || December 20, 2014 || Kitt Peak || Spacewatch ||  || align=right | 1.6 km || 
|-id=574 bgcolor=#E9E9E9
| 583574 ||  || — || March 30, 2011 || Haleakala || Pan-STARRS ||  || align=right | 1.7 km || 
|-id=575 bgcolor=#E9E9E9
| 583575 ||  || — || February 10, 2016 || Haleakala || Pan-STARRS ||  || align=right | 1.5 km || 
|-id=576 bgcolor=#E9E9E9
| 583576 ||  || — || October 30, 2005 || Kitt Peak || Spacewatch ||  || align=right | 2.3 km || 
|-id=577 bgcolor=#E9E9E9
| 583577 ||  || — || April 25, 2007 || Mount Lemmon || Mount Lemmon Survey ||  || align=right | 1.7 km || 
|-id=578 bgcolor=#fefefe
| 583578 ||  || — || May 15, 2012 || Mount Lemmon || Mount Lemmon Survey ||  || align=right data-sort-value="0.80" | 800 m || 
|-id=579 bgcolor=#E9E9E9
| 583579 ||  || — || August 22, 2004 || Kitt Peak || Spacewatch ||  || align=right | 1.2 km || 
|-id=580 bgcolor=#E9E9E9
| 583580 ||  || — || May 4, 2016 || Haleakala || Pan-STARRS ||  || align=right data-sort-value="0.97" | 970 m || 
|-id=581 bgcolor=#E9E9E9
| 583581 ||  || — || May 2, 2016 || Haleakala || Pan-STARRS ||  || align=right | 1.4 km || 
|-id=582 bgcolor=#E9E9E9
| 583582 ||  || — || May 3, 2016 || Mount Lemmon || Mount Lemmon Survey ||  || align=right | 1.6 km || 
|-id=583 bgcolor=#d6d6d6
| 583583 ||  || — || May 9, 2016 || Kitt Peak || Spacewatch ||  || align=right | 2.9 km || 
|-id=584 bgcolor=#FA8072
| 583584 ||  || — || September 16, 2009 || Mount Lemmon || Mount Lemmon Survey || H || align=right data-sort-value="0.52" | 520 m || 
|-id=585 bgcolor=#E9E9E9
| 583585 ||  || — || October 1, 2003 || Kitt Peak || Spacewatch ||  || align=right | 1.6 km || 
|-id=586 bgcolor=#d6d6d6
| 583586 ||  || — || July 16, 2002 || Palomar || NEAT ||  || align=right | 3.4 km || 
|-id=587 bgcolor=#E9E9E9
| 583587 ||  || — || May 2, 2016 || Haleakala || Pan-STARRS ||  || align=right | 1.7 km || 
|-id=588 bgcolor=#E9E9E9
| 583588 ||  || — || March 14, 2011 || Mount Lemmon || Mount Lemmon Survey ||  || align=right | 1.2 km || 
|-id=589 bgcolor=#d6d6d6
| 583589 ||  || — || September 6, 2012 || Mount Lemmon || Mount Lemmon Survey ||  || align=right | 1.8 km || 
|-id=590 bgcolor=#E9E9E9
| 583590 ||  || — || September 5, 2008 || Kitt Peak || Spacewatch ||  || align=right | 1.5 km || 
|-id=591 bgcolor=#E9E9E9
| 583591 ||  || — || April 3, 2016 || Haleakala || Pan-STARRS ||  || align=right data-sort-value="0.87" | 870 m || 
|-id=592 bgcolor=#E9E9E9
| 583592 ||  || — || November 17, 2009 || Mount Lemmon || Mount Lemmon Survey ||  || align=right | 1.7 km || 
|-id=593 bgcolor=#E9E9E9
| 583593 ||  || — || May 30, 2016 || Haleakala || Pan-STARRS ||  || align=right | 1.4 km || 
|-id=594 bgcolor=#d6d6d6
| 583594 ||  || — || May 16, 2016 || Haleakala || Pan-STARRS ||  || align=right | 2.6 km || 
|-id=595 bgcolor=#E9E9E9
| 583595 ||  || — || April 3, 2016 || Haleakala || Pan-STARRS ||  || align=right | 2.0 km || 
|-id=596 bgcolor=#E9E9E9
| 583596 ||  || — || May 29, 2012 || Mount Lemmon || Mount Lemmon Survey ||  || align=right | 1.0 km || 
|-id=597 bgcolor=#E9E9E9
| 583597 ||  || — || March 5, 2016 || Haleakala || Pan-STARRS ||  || align=right | 2.6 km || 
|-id=598 bgcolor=#E9E9E9
| 583598 ||  || — || August 23, 2004 || Kitt Peak || Spacewatch ||  || align=right | 1.2 km || 
|-id=599 bgcolor=#E9E9E9
| 583599 ||  || — || January 29, 2015 || Haleakala || Pan-STARRS ||  || align=right | 1.2 km || 
|-id=600 bgcolor=#E9E9E9
| 583600 ||  || — || October 8, 2008 || Mount Lemmon || Mount Lemmon Survey ||  || align=right | 1.3 km || 
|}

583601–583700 

|-bgcolor=#E9E9E9
| 583601 ||  || — || March 7, 2016 || Haleakala || Pan-STARRS ||  || align=right | 1.3 km || 
|-id=602 bgcolor=#d6d6d6
| 583602 ||  || — || January 21, 2015 || Haleakala || Pan-STARRS ||  || align=right | 1.8 km || 
|-id=603 bgcolor=#E9E9E9
| 583603 ||  || — || February 5, 2011 || Mount Lemmon || Mount Lemmon Survey ||  || align=right data-sort-value="0.81" | 810 m || 
|-id=604 bgcolor=#E9E9E9
| 583604 ||  || — || December 8, 2010 || Mount Lemmon || Mount Lemmon Survey ||  || align=right | 1.3 km || 
|-id=605 bgcolor=#E9E9E9
| 583605 ||  || — || June 5, 2016 || Haleakala || Pan-STARRS ||  || align=right data-sort-value="0.94" | 940 m || 
|-id=606 bgcolor=#E9E9E9
| 583606 ||  || — || February 9, 2011 || Catalina || CSS ||  || align=right | 1.5 km || 
|-id=607 bgcolor=#E9E9E9
| 583607 ||  || — || January 20, 2015 || Kitt Peak || Spacewatch ||  || align=right | 1.7 km || 
|-id=608 bgcolor=#E9E9E9
| 583608 ||  || — || May 30, 2016 || Haleakala || Pan-STARRS ||  || align=right data-sort-value="0.76" | 760 m || 
|-id=609 bgcolor=#E9E9E9
| 583609 ||  || — || May 2, 2016 || Haleakala || Pan-STARRS ||  || align=right | 1.9 km || 
|-id=610 bgcolor=#d6d6d6
| 583610 ||  || — || September 14, 2007 || Mount Lemmon || Mount Lemmon Survey ||  || align=right | 2.8 km || 
|-id=611 bgcolor=#E9E9E9
| 583611 ||  || — || January 23, 2006 || Kitt Peak || Spacewatch ||  || align=right | 1.4 km || 
|-id=612 bgcolor=#E9E9E9
| 583612 ||  || — || December 30, 2014 || Haleakala || Pan-STARRS ||  || align=right | 1.1 km || 
|-id=613 bgcolor=#E9E9E9
| 583613 ||  || — || January 13, 2011 || Kitt Peak || Spacewatch ||  || align=right | 1.6 km || 
|-id=614 bgcolor=#E9E9E9
| 583614 ||  || — || May 10, 2007 || Mount Lemmon || Mount Lemmon Survey ||  || align=right | 2.1 km || 
|-id=615 bgcolor=#d6d6d6
| 583615 ||  || — || September 29, 2010 || Mount Lemmon || Mount Lemmon Survey || 3:2 || align=right | 4.0 km || 
|-id=616 bgcolor=#E9E9E9
| 583616 ||  || — || October 4, 2004 || Kitt Peak || Spacewatch ||  || align=right | 1.6 km || 
|-id=617 bgcolor=#d6d6d6
| 583617 ||  || — || May 6, 2011 || Kitt Peak || Spacewatch ||  || align=right | 2.0 km || 
|-id=618 bgcolor=#E9E9E9
| 583618 ||  || — || October 3, 2013 || Haleakala || Pan-STARRS ||  || align=right | 1.0 km || 
|-id=619 bgcolor=#E9E9E9
| 583619 ||  || — || August 13, 2012 || Siding Spring || SSS ||  || align=right | 1.8 km || 
|-id=620 bgcolor=#d6d6d6
| 583620 ||  || — || May 21, 2006 || Kitt Peak || Spacewatch ||  || align=right | 2.6 km || 
|-id=621 bgcolor=#E9E9E9
| 583621 ||  || — || February 17, 2015 || Haleakala || Pan-STARRS ||  || align=right | 1.3 km || 
|-id=622 bgcolor=#E9E9E9
| 583622 ||  || — || June 5, 2016 || Haleakala || Pan-STARRS ||  || align=right data-sort-value="0.91" | 910 m || 
|-id=623 bgcolor=#E9E9E9
| 583623 ||  || — || January 30, 2011 || Kitt Peak || Spacewatch ||  || align=right | 1.1 km || 
|-id=624 bgcolor=#E9E9E9
| 583624 ||  || — || June 5, 2016 || Haleakala || Pan-STARRS ||  || align=right | 1.1 km || 
|-id=625 bgcolor=#d6d6d6
| 583625 ||  || — || October 20, 2012 || Haleakala || Pan-STARRS ||  || align=right | 2.2 km || 
|-id=626 bgcolor=#E9E9E9
| 583626 ||  || — || February 16, 2015 || Haleakala || Pan-STARRS ||  || align=right | 1.6 km || 
|-id=627 bgcolor=#E9E9E9
| 583627 ||  || — || February 12, 2011 || Mount Lemmon || Mount Lemmon Survey ||  || align=right | 1.2 km || 
|-id=628 bgcolor=#E9E9E9
| 583628 ||  || — || May 30, 2016 || Haleakala || Pan-STARRS ||  || align=right | 1.4 km || 
|-id=629 bgcolor=#E9E9E9
| 583629 ||  || — || June 5, 2016 || Haleakala || Pan-STARRS ||  || align=right | 1.1 km || 
|-id=630 bgcolor=#E9E9E9
| 583630 ||  || — || January 27, 2015 || Haleakala || Pan-STARRS ||  || align=right | 1.7 km || 
|-id=631 bgcolor=#E9E9E9
| 583631 ||  || — || February 13, 2015 || XuYi || PMO NEO ||  || align=right | 2.2 km || 
|-id=632 bgcolor=#E9E9E9
| 583632 ||  || — || June 5, 2016 || Haleakala || Pan-STARRS ||  || align=right | 1.3 km || 
|-id=633 bgcolor=#E9E9E9
| 583633 ||  || — || May 27, 2012 || Mount Lemmon || Mount Lemmon Survey ||  || align=right | 1.0 km || 
|-id=634 bgcolor=#E9E9E9
| 583634 ||  || — || October 22, 2012 || Mount Lemmon || Mount Lemmon Survey ||  || align=right | 1.8 km || 
|-id=635 bgcolor=#d6d6d6
| 583635 ||  || — || June 5, 2016 || Haleakala || Pan-STARRS ||  || align=right | 2.5 km || 
|-id=636 bgcolor=#fefefe
| 583636 ||  || — || June 7, 2016 || Mount Lemmon || Mount Lemmon Survey ||  || align=right data-sort-value="0.71" | 710 m || 
|-id=637 bgcolor=#E9E9E9
| 583637 ||  || — || September 10, 2012 || Crni Vrh || S. Matičič ||  || align=right | 1.4 km || 
|-id=638 bgcolor=#d6d6d6
| 583638 ||  || — || November 22, 2008 || Kitt Peak || Spacewatch ||  || align=right | 3.0 km || 
|-id=639 bgcolor=#E9E9E9
| 583639 ||  || — || May 10, 2007 || Mount Lemmon || Mount Lemmon Survey ||  || align=right | 2.0 km || 
|-id=640 bgcolor=#E9E9E9
| 583640 ||  || — || April 24, 2012 || Mount Lemmon || Mount Lemmon Survey ||  || align=right | 1.2 km || 
|-id=641 bgcolor=#E9E9E9
| 583641 ||  || — || April 1, 2016 || Haleakala || Pan-STARRS ||  || align=right | 1.0 km || 
|-id=642 bgcolor=#E9E9E9
| 583642 ||  || — || May 5, 2016 || Haleakala || Pan-STARRS ||  || align=right | 2.1 km || 
|-id=643 bgcolor=#E9E9E9
| 583643 ||  || — || February 5, 2016 || Haleakala || Pan-STARRS ||  || align=right | 1.8 km || 
|-id=644 bgcolor=#E9E9E9
| 583644 ||  || — || April 21, 2004 || Kitt Peak || Spacewatch ||  || align=right data-sort-value="0.94" | 940 m || 
|-id=645 bgcolor=#d6d6d6
| 583645 ||  || — || November 22, 2006 || Mount Lemmon || Mount Lemmon Survey ||  || align=right | 4.2 km || 
|-id=646 bgcolor=#fefefe
| 583646 ||  || — || June 8, 2016 || Mount Lemmon || Mount Lemmon Survey || H || align=right data-sort-value="0.61" | 610 m || 
|-id=647 bgcolor=#d6d6d6
| 583647 ||  || — || April 19, 2015 || Mount Lemmon || Mount Lemmon Survey ||  || align=right | 2.1 km || 
|-id=648 bgcolor=#d6d6d6
| 583648 ||  || — || June 5, 2011 || Mount Lemmon || Mount Lemmon Survey ||  || align=right | 2.0 km || 
|-id=649 bgcolor=#E9E9E9
| 583649 ||  || — || April 14, 2007 || Mount Lemmon || Mount Lemmon Survey ||  || align=right | 1.6 km || 
|-id=650 bgcolor=#E9E9E9
| 583650 ||  || — || March 11, 2015 || Kitt Peak || Spacewatch ||  || align=right | 1.7 km || 
|-id=651 bgcolor=#d6d6d6
| 583651 ||  || — || March 17, 2015 || Haleakala || Pan-STARRS ||  || align=right | 1.9 km || 
|-id=652 bgcolor=#d6d6d6
| 583652 ||  || — || April 25, 2015 || Haleakala || Pan-STARRS ||  || align=right | 2.3 km || 
|-id=653 bgcolor=#E9E9E9
| 583653 ||  || — || May 16, 2007 || Mount Lemmon || Mount Lemmon Survey ||  || align=right | 1.4 km || 
|-id=654 bgcolor=#E9E9E9
| 583654 ||  || — || January 29, 2011 || Kitt Peak || Spacewatch ||  || align=right | 1.9 km || 
|-id=655 bgcolor=#d6d6d6
| 583655 ||  || — || September 30, 2005 || Palomar || NEAT ||  || align=right | 2.8 km || 
|-id=656 bgcolor=#d6d6d6
| 583656 ||  || — || June 7, 2016 || Haleakala || Pan-STARRS ||  || align=right | 2.0 km || 
|-id=657 bgcolor=#d6d6d6
| 583657 ||  || — || April 25, 2015 || Haleakala || Pan-STARRS ||  || align=right | 1.6 km || 
|-id=658 bgcolor=#d6d6d6
| 583658 ||  || — || January 22, 2015 || Haleakala || Pan-STARRS ||  || align=right | 2.2 km || 
|-id=659 bgcolor=#E9E9E9
| 583659 ||  || — || October 30, 2005 || Mount Lemmon || Mount Lemmon Survey ||  || align=right | 2.0 km || 
|-id=660 bgcolor=#E9E9E9
| 583660 ||  || — || November 24, 2009 || Kitt Peak || Spacewatch ||  || align=right | 2.6 km || 
|-id=661 bgcolor=#E9E9E9
| 583661 ||  || — || March 28, 2011 || Mount Lemmon || Mount Lemmon Survey ||  || align=right | 1.9 km || 
|-id=662 bgcolor=#d6d6d6
| 583662 ||  || — || June 5, 2016 || Haleakala || Pan-STARRS ||  || align=right | 3.1 km || 
|-id=663 bgcolor=#d6d6d6
| 583663 ||  || — || June 18, 2005 || Mount Lemmon || Mount Lemmon Survey ||  || align=right | 2.6 km || 
|-id=664 bgcolor=#E9E9E9
| 583664 ||  || — || June 8, 2016 || Mount Lemmon || Mount Lemmon Survey ||  || align=right | 1.4 km || 
|-id=665 bgcolor=#d6d6d6
| 583665 ||  || — || June 7, 2016 || Haleakala || Pan-STARRS ||  || align=right | 2.7 km || 
|-id=666 bgcolor=#fefefe
| 583666 ||  || — || June 8, 2016 || Mount Lemmon || Mount Lemmon Survey || H || align=right data-sort-value="0.62" | 620 m || 
|-id=667 bgcolor=#E9E9E9
| 583667 ||  || — || June 8, 2016 || Haleakala || Pan-STARRS ||  || align=right | 1.6 km || 
|-id=668 bgcolor=#d6d6d6
| 583668 ||  || — || January 22, 2015 || Haleakala || Pan-STARRS ||  || align=right | 1.8 km || 
|-id=669 bgcolor=#FA8072
| 583669 ||  || — || October 2, 2006 || Mount Lemmon || Mount Lemmon Survey ||  || align=right data-sort-value="0.49" | 490 m || 
|-id=670 bgcolor=#E9E9E9
| 583670 ||  || — || December 29, 2014 || Haleakala || Pan-STARRS ||  || align=right | 2.0 km || 
|-id=671 bgcolor=#d6d6d6
| 583671 ||  || — || December 22, 2006 || Mount Lemmon || Mount Lemmon Survey ||  || align=right | 2.9 km || 
|-id=672 bgcolor=#E9E9E9
| 583672 ||  || — || June 12, 2016 || Mount Lemmon || Mount Lemmon Survey ||  || align=right | 1.4 km || 
|-id=673 bgcolor=#d6d6d6
| 583673 ||  || — || June 16, 2016 || Haleakala || Pan-STARRS ||  || align=right | 2.7 km || 
|-id=674 bgcolor=#E9E9E9
| 583674 ||  || — || October 8, 2012 || Haleakala || Pan-STARRS ||  || align=right | 1.8 km || 
|-id=675 bgcolor=#d6d6d6
| 583675 ||  || — || January 26, 2014 || Calar Alto-CASADO || S. Mottola, S. Hellmich ||  || align=right | 2.6 km || 
|-id=676 bgcolor=#d6d6d6
| 583676 ||  || — || July 3, 2005 || Mount Lemmon || Mount Lemmon Survey ||  || align=right | 3.4 km || 
|-id=677 bgcolor=#fefefe
| 583677 ||  || — || December 17, 2014 || Haleakala || Pan-STARRS || H || align=right data-sort-value="0.68" | 680 m || 
|-id=678 bgcolor=#E9E9E9
| 583678 ||  || — || August 19, 2012 || Siding Spring || SSS ||  || align=right | 2.9 km || 
|-id=679 bgcolor=#E9E9E9
| 583679 ||  || — || February 6, 2002 || Kitt Peak || R. Millis, M. W. Buie ||  || align=right | 1.8 km || 
|-id=680 bgcolor=#d6d6d6
| 583680 ||  || — || November 12, 2012 || Mount Lemmon || Mount Lemmon Survey ||  || align=right | 1.5 km || 
|-id=681 bgcolor=#d6d6d6
| 583681 ||  || — || March 10, 2005 || Mount Lemmon || Mount Lemmon Survey ||  || align=right | 2.3 km || 
|-id=682 bgcolor=#d6d6d6
| 583682 ||  || — || September 25, 2011 || Haleakala || Pan-STARRS ||  || align=right | 2.8 km || 
|-id=683 bgcolor=#d6d6d6
| 583683 ||  || — || July 30, 2005 || Palomar || NEAT ||  || align=right | 3.4 km || 
|-id=684 bgcolor=#d6d6d6
| 583684 ||  || — || November 23, 2012 || Nogales || M. Schwartz, P. R. Holvorcem ||  || align=right | 2.8 km || 
|-id=685 bgcolor=#d6d6d6
| 583685 ||  || — || November 27, 2006 || Kitt Peak || Spacewatch ||  || align=right | 2.5 km || 
|-id=686 bgcolor=#d6d6d6
| 583686 ||  || — || February 23, 2015 || Haleakala || Pan-STARRS ||  || align=right | 2.5 km || 
|-id=687 bgcolor=#E9E9E9
| 583687 ||  || — || August 11, 2012 || Haleakala || Pan-STARRS ||  || align=right | 1.2 km || 
|-id=688 bgcolor=#fefefe
| 583688 ||  || — || May 24, 2006 || Bergisch Gladbach || W. Bickel ||  || align=right data-sort-value="0.75" | 750 m || 
|-id=689 bgcolor=#d6d6d6
| 583689 ||  || — || April 13, 2015 || Haleakala || Pan-STARRS ||  || align=right | 2.9 km || 
|-id=690 bgcolor=#E9E9E9
| 583690 ||  || — || June 21, 2007 || Kitt Peak || Spacewatch ||  || align=right | 2.2 km || 
|-id=691 bgcolor=#E9E9E9
| 583691 ||  || — || September 16, 2012 || Kitt Peak || Spacewatch ||  || align=right | 2.0 km || 
|-id=692 bgcolor=#d6d6d6
| 583692 ||  || — || August 2, 2011 || Haleakala || Pan-STARRS ||  || align=right | 1.8 km || 
|-id=693 bgcolor=#d6d6d6
| 583693 ||  || — || July 8, 2016 || Haleakala || Pan-STARRS ||  || align=right | 2.8 km || 
|-id=694 bgcolor=#d6d6d6
| 583694 ||  || — || July 20, 2001 || Palomar || NEAT ||  || align=right | 2.7 km || 
|-id=695 bgcolor=#FA8072
| 583695 ||  || — || August 27, 2003 || Palomar || NEAT || H || align=right data-sort-value="0.68" | 680 m || 
|-id=696 bgcolor=#d6d6d6
| 583696 ||  || — || January 9, 2014 || Haleakala || Pan-STARRS ||  || align=right | 3.3 km || 
|-id=697 bgcolor=#fefefe
| 583697 ||  || — || September 29, 2005 || Kitt Peak || Spacewatch ||  || align=right data-sort-value="0.65" | 650 m || 
|-id=698 bgcolor=#d6d6d6
| 583698 ||  || — || February 18, 2015 || Haleakala || Pan-STARRS ||  || align=right | 2.2 km || 
|-id=699 bgcolor=#d6d6d6
| 583699 ||  || — || July 3, 2016 || Mount Lemmon || Mount Lemmon Survey ||  || align=right | 2.5 km || 
|-id=700 bgcolor=#d6d6d6
| 583700 ||  || — || January 30, 2009 || Mount Lemmon || Mount Lemmon Survey ||  || align=right | 1.8 km || 
|}

583701–583800 

|-bgcolor=#fefefe
| 583701 ||  || — || June 7, 2016 || Haleakala || Pan-STARRS || H || align=right data-sort-value="0.59" | 590 m || 
|-id=702 bgcolor=#fefefe
| 583702 ||  || — || January 15, 2015 || Haleakala || Pan-STARRS || H || align=right data-sort-value="0.52" | 520 m || 
|-id=703 bgcolor=#fefefe
| 583703 ||  || — || March 13, 2012 || Kitt Peak || Spacewatch ||  || align=right data-sort-value="0.75" | 750 m || 
|-id=704 bgcolor=#d6d6d6
| 583704 ||  || — || July 12, 2016 || Mount Lemmon || Mount Lemmon Survey ||  || align=right | 2.4 km || 
|-id=705 bgcolor=#fefefe
| 583705 ||  || — || July 12, 2016 || Mount Lemmon || Mount Lemmon Survey ||  || align=right data-sort-value="0.82" | 820 m || 
|-id=706 bgcolor=#fefefe
| 583706 ||  || — || July 4, 2016 || Haleakala || Pan-STARRS ||  || align=right data-sort-value="0.78" | 780 m || 
|-id=707 bgcolor=#fefefe
| 583707 ||  || — || March 21, 2015 || Haleakala || Pan-STARRS ||  || align=right data-sort-value="0.90" | 900 m || 
|-id=708 bgcolor=#FA8072
| 583708 ||  || — || February 7, 2002 || Socorro || LINEAR || H || align=right data-sort-value="0.56" | 560 m || 
|-id=709 bgcolor=#fefefe
| 583709 ||  || — || November 20, 2003 || Apache Point || SDSS Collaboration ||  || align=right data-sort-value="0.68" | 680 m || 
|-id=710 bgcolor=#d6d6d6
| 583710 ||  || — || October 19, 2011 || Kitt Peak || Spacewatch ||  || align=right | 2.0 km || 
|-id=711 bgcolor=#d6d6d6
| 583711 ||  || — || July 13, 2016 || Haleakala || Pan-STARRS ||  || align=right | 2.6 km || 
|-id=712 bgcolor=#d6d6d6
| 583712 ||  || — || April 11, 2015 || Mount Lemmon || Mount Lemmon Survey ||  || align=right | 2.5 km || 
|-id=713 bgcolor=#d6d6d6
| 583713 ||  || — || July 13, 2016 || Haleakala || Pan-STARRS ||  || align=right | 1.6 km || 
|-id=714 bgcolor=#d6d6d6
| 583714 ||  || — || July 13, 2016 || Mount Lemmon || Mount Lemmon Survey ||  || align=right | 1.8 km || 
|-id=715 bgcolor=#d6d6d6
| 583715 ||  || — || October 25, 2011 || Haleakala || Pan-STARRS ||  || align=right | 2.7 km || 
|-id=716 bgcolor=#fefefe
| 583716 ||  || — || December 12, 2014 || Haleakala || Pan-STARRS || H || align=right data-sort-value="0.51" | 510 m || 
|-id=717 bgcolor=#fefefe
| 583717 ||  || — || January 20, 2015 || Haleakala || Pan-STARRS || H || align=right data-sort-value="0.49" | 490 m || 
|-id=718 bgcolor=#fefefe
| 583718 ||  || — || January 28, 2015 || Haleakala || Pan-STARRS || H || align=right data-sort-value="0.49" | 490 m || 
|-id=719 bgcolor=#d6d6d6
| 583719 ||  || — || August 19, 2006 || Kitt Peak || Spacewatch ||  || align=right | 1.8 km || 
|-id=720 bgcolor=#d6d6d6
| 583720 ||  || — || July 9, 2015 || Haleakala || Pan-STARRS ||  || align=right | 3.0 km || 
|-id=721 bgcolor=#d6d6d6
| 583721 ||  || — || November 27, 2006 || Mount Lemmon || Mount Lemmon Survey ||  || align=right | 2.3 km || 
|-id=722 bgcolor=#d6d6d6
| 583722 ||  || — || May 21, 2015 || Haleakala || Pan-STARRS ||  || align=right | 2.0 km || 
|-id=723 bgcolor=#d6d6d6
| 583723 ||  || — || July 5, 2016 || Mount Lemmon || Mount Lemmon Survey ||  || align=right | 2.7 km || 
|-id=724 bgcolor=#d6d6d6
| 583724 ||  || — || February 20, 2009 || Dauban || C. Rinner, F. Kugel ||  || align=right | 3.0 km || 
|-id=725 bgcolor=#d6d6d6
| 583725 ||  || — || January 13, 2008 || Kitt Peak || Spacewatch ||  || align=right | 2.5 km || 
|-id=726 bgcolor=#d6d6d6
| 583726 ||  || — || July 11, 2016 || Haleakala || Pan-STARRS ||  || align=right | 2.4 km || 
|-id=727 bgcolor=#d6d6d6
| 583727 ||  || — || February 9, 2008 || Mount Lemmon || Mount Lemmon Survey ||  || align=right | 2.6 km || 
|-id=728 bgcolor=#d6d6d6
| 583728 ||  || — || September 2, 2011 || Charleston || R. Holmes ||  || align=right | 2.5 km || 
|-id=729 bgcolor=#d6d6d6
| 583729 ||  || — || October 21, 2011 || Zelenchukskaya Stn || T. V. Kryachko, B. Satovski ||  || align=right | 2.9 km || 
|-id=730 bgcolor=#d6d6d6
| 583730 ||  || — || February 26, 2014 || Haleakala || Pan-STARRS ||  || align=right | 2.5 km || 
|-id=731 bgcolor=#d6d6d6
| 583731 ||  || — || July 7, 2016 || Haleakala || Pan-STARRS ||  || align=right | 2.1 km || 
|-id=732 bgcolor=#d6d6d6
| 583732 ||  || — || October 18, 2011 || Kitt Peak || Spacewatch ||  || align=right | 2.7 km || 
|-id=733 bgcolor=#d6d6d6
| 583733 ||  || — || October 20, 2006 || Kitt Peak || Spacewatch ||  || align=right | 1.7 km || 
|-id=734 bgcolor=#E9E9E9
| 583734 ||  || — || October 7, 2005 || Mauna Kea || Mauna Kea Obs. ||  || align=right | 2.0 km || 
|-id=735 bgcolor=#d6d6d6
| 583735 ||  || — || April 1, 2003 || Apache Point || SDSS Collaboration ||  || align=right | 2.9 km || 
|-id=736 bgcolor=#d6d6d6
| 583736 ||  || — || January 28, 2015 || Haleakala || Pan-STARRS ||  || align=right | 2.1 km || 
|-id=737 bgcolor=#d6d6d6
| 583737 ||  || — || July 5, 2016 || Haleakala || Pan-STARRS ||  || align=right | 2.1 km || 
|-id=738 bgcolor=#d6d6d6
| 583738 ||  || — || July 5, 2016 || Haleakala || Pan-STARRS ||  || align=right | 2.1 km || 
|-id=739 bgcolor=#d6d6d6
| 583739 ||  || — || April 23, 2015 || Haleakala || Pan-STARRS ||  || align=right | 1.8 km || 
|-id=740 bgcolor=#d6d6d6
| 583740 ||  || — || September 18, 2011 || Mount Lemmon || Mount Lemmon Survey ||  || align=right | 2.5 km || 
|-id=741 bgcolor=#d6d6d6
| 583741 ||  || — || August 29, 2011 || Piszkesteto || K. Sárneczky ||  || align=right | 3.0 km || 
|-id=742 bgcolor=#d6d6d6
| 583742 ||  || — || August 31, 2005 || Palomar || NEAT ||  || align=right | 4.0 km || 
|-id=743 bgcolor=#d6d6d6
| 583743 ||  || — || August 6, 2005 || Palomar || NEAT ||  || align=right | 3.9 km || 
|-id=744 bgcolor=#d6d6d6
| 583744 ||  || — || April 24, 2015 || Haleakala || Pan-STARRS ||  || align=right | 2.3 km || 
|-id=745 bgcolor=#d6d6d6
| 583745 ||  || — || September 4, 2011 || Kitt Peak || Spacewatch ||  || align=right | 2.0 km || 
|-id=746 bgcolor=#d6d6d6
| 583746 ||  || — || July 13, 2016 || Haleakala || Pan-STARRS ||  || align=right | 2.5 km || 
|-id=747 bgcolor=#d6d6d6
| 583747 ||  || — || January 10, 2013 || Haleakala || Pan-STARRS ||  || align=right | 2.4 km || 
|-id=748 bgcolor=#d6d6d6
| 583748 ||  || — || April 24, 2015 || Haleakala || Pan-STARRS ||  || align=right | 1.8 km || 
|-id=749 bgcolor=#d6d6d6
| 583749 ||  || — || September 24, 2011 || Haleakala || Pan-STARRS ||  || align=right | 2.1 km || 
|-id=750 bgcolor=#d6d6d6
| 583750 ||  || — || July 13, 2016 || Haleakala || Pan-STARRS ||  || align=right | 1.8 km || 
|-id=751 bgcolor=#C2E0FF
| 583751 ||  || — || June 17, 2015 || Haleakala || Pan-STARRS || twotino || align=right | 180 km || 
|-id=752 bgcolor=#d6d6d6
| 583752 ||  || — || July 9, 2016 || Haleakala || Pan-STARRS ||  || align=right | 2.9 km || 
|-id=753 bgcolor=#fefefe
| 583753 ||  || — || July 14, 2016 || Haleakala || Pan-STARRS ||  || align=right data-sort-value="0.65" | 650 m || 
|-id=754 bgcolor=#d6d6d6
| 583754 ||  || — || July 8, 2016 || Haleakala || Pan-STARRS ||  || align=right | 2.0 km || 
|-id=755 bgcolor=#d6d6d6
| 583755 ||  || — || July 11, 2016 || Haleakala || Pan-STARRS ||  || align=right | 2.7 km || 
|-id=756 bgcolor=#d6d6d6
| 583756 ||  || — || July 11, 2016 || Haleakala || Pan-STARRS ||  || align=right | 2.3 km || 
|-id=757 bgcolor=#d6d6d6
| 583757 ||  || — || July 12, 2016 || Haleakala || Pan-STARRS ||  || align=right | 1.7 km || 
|-id=758 bgcolor=#d6d6d6
| 583758 ||  || — || July 5, 2016 || Haleakala || Pan-STARRS ||  || align=right | 2.4 km || 
|-id=759 bgcolor=#d6d6d6
| 583759 ||  || — || July 7, 2016 || Haleakala || Pan-STARRS ||  || align=right | 2.8 km || 
|-id=760 bgcolor=#d6d6d6
| 583760 ||  || — || July 7, 2016 || Haleakala || Pan-STARRS ||  || align=right | 2.1 km || 
|-id=761 bgcolor=#d6d6d6
| 583761 ||  || — || July 7, 2016 || Haleakala || Pan-STARRS ||  || align=right | 2.2 km || 
|-id=762 bgcolor=#fefefe
| 583762 ||  || — || July 4, 2016 || Haleakala || Pan-STARRS ||  || align=right data-sort-value="0.78" | 780 m || 
|-id=763 bgcolor=#fefefe
| 583763 ||  || — || December 15, 2006 || Socorro || LINEAR || H || align=right data-sort-value="0.98" | 980 m || 
|-id=764 bgcolor=#E9E9E9
| 583764 ||  || — || March 13, 2007 || Mount Lemmon || Mount Lemmon Survey ||  || align=right | 1.6 km || 
|-id=765 bgcolor=#d6d6d6
| 583765 ||  || — || November 11, 2007 || Mount Lemmon || Mount Lemmon Survey ||  || align=right | 3.3 km || 
|-id=766 bgcolor=#d6d6d6
| 583766 ||  || — || May 15, 2015 || Haleakala || Pan-STARRS ||  || align=right | 2.4 km || 
|-id=767 bgcolor=#d6d6d6
| 583767 ||  || — || July 31, 2005 || Palomar || NEAT ||  || align=right | 2.5 km || 
|-id=768 bgcolor=#d6d6d6
| 583768 ||  || — || August 25, 2005 || Palomar || NEAT ||  || align=right | 3.4 km || 
|-id=769 bgcolor=#d6d6d6
| 583769 ||  || — || March 11, 2014 || Mount Lemmon || Mount Lemmon Survey ||  || align=right | 2.6 km || 
|-id=770 bgcolor=#E9E9E9
| 583770 ||  || — || September 10, 2007 || Kitt Peak || Spacewatch ||  || align=right | 1.8 km || 
|-id=771 bgcolor=#d6d6d6
| 583771 ||  || — || July 30, 2016 || Haleakala || Pan-STARRS ||  || align=right | 2.9 km || 
|-id=772 bgcolor=#d6d6d6
| 583772 ||  || — || October 26, 2012 || Haleakala || Pan-STARRS ||  || align=right | 2.2 km || 
|-id=773 bgcolor=#d6d6d6
| 583773 ||  || — || March 6, 2014 || Mount Lemmon || Mount Lemmon Survey ||  || align=right | 2.4 km || 
|-id=774 bgcolor=#d6d6d6
| 583774 ||  || — || April 25, 2015 || Haleakala || Pan-STARRS ||  || align=right | 2.0 km || 
|-id=775 bgcolor=#d6d6d6
| 583775 ||  || — || February 19, 2009 || Kitt Peak || Spacewatch ||  || align=right | 2.3 km || 
|-id=776 bgcolor=#fefefe
| 583776 ||  || — || August 18, 2009 || Kitt Peak || Spacewatch ||  || align=right data-sort-value="0.68" | 680 m || 
|-id=777 bgcolor=#d6d6d6
| 583777 ||  || — || May 10, 2015 || Mount Lemmon || Mount Lemmon Survey ||  || align=right | 1.9 km || 
|-id=778 bgcolor=#d6d6d6
| 583778 ||  || — || November 16, 2006 || Mount Lemmon || Mount Lemmon Survey ||  || align=right | 1.7 km || 
|-id=779 bgcolor=#E9E9E9
| 583779 ||  || — || December 31, 2013 || Kitt Peak || Spacewatch ||  || align=right | 1.9 km || 
|-id=780 bgcolor=#fefefe
| 583780 ||  || — || August 17, 2006 || Palomar || NEAT ||  || align=right data-sort-value="0.62" | 620 m || 
|-id=781 bgcolor=#d6d6d6
| 583781 ||  || — || March 19, 2009 || Mount Lemmon || Mount Lemmon Survey ||  || align=right | 2.7 km || 
|-id=782 bgcolor=#fefefe
| 583782 ||  || — || April 15, 2015 || Mount Lemmon || Mount Lemmon Survey ||  || align=right data-sort-value="0.70" | 700 m || 
|-id=783 bgcolor=#d6d6d6
| 583783 ||  || — || August 2, 2016 || Haleakala || Pan-STARRS ||  || align=right | 1.8 km || 
|-id=784 bgcolor=#d6d6d6
| 583784 ||  || — || October 18, 2006 || Kitt Peak || Spacewatch ||  || align=right | 2.9 km || 
|-id=785 bgcolor=#d6d6d6
| 583785 ||  || — || November 14, 2007 || Mount Lemmon || Mount Lemmon Survey ||  || align=right | 2.3 km || 
|-id=786 bgcolor=#d6d6d6
| 583786 ||  || — || September 18, 2006 || Kitt Peak || Spacewatch ||  || align=right | 2.6 km || 
|-id=787 bgcolor=#d6d6d6
| 583787 ||  || — || September 19, 2006 || Catalina || CSS ||  || align=right | 3.2 km || 
|-id=788 bgcolor=#d6d6d6
| 583788 ||  || — || November 19, 2007 || Mount Lemmon || Mount Lemmon Survey ||  || align=right | 2.3 km || 
|-id=789 bgcolor=#E9E9E9
| 583789 ||  || — || January 29, 2014 || Catalina || CSS ||  || align=right | 1.7 km || 
|-id=790 bgcolor=#d6d6d6
| 583790 ||  || — || June 12, 2015 || Mount Lemmon || Mount Lemmon Survey ||  || align=right | 2.8 km || 
|-id=791 bgcolor=#d6d6d6
| 583791 ||  || — || February 26, 2014 || Mount Lemmon || Mount Lemmon Survey ||  || align=right | 2.5 km || 
|-id=792 bgcolor=#d6d6d6
| 583792 ||  || — || October 12, 2007 || Mount Lemmon || Mount Lemmon Survey ||  || align=right | 2.1 km || 
|-id=793 bgcolor=#d6d6d6
| 583793 ||  || — || July 4, 2016 || Haleakala || Pan-STARRS ||  || align=right | 2.5 km || 
|-id=794 bgcolor=#d6d6d6
| 583794 ||  || — || April 15, 2015 || Kitt Peak || L. H. Wasserman, M. W. Buie ||  || align=right | 2.4 km || 
|-id=795 bgcolor=#d6d6d6
| 583795 ||  || — || February 23, 2015 || Haleakala || Pan-STARRS ||  || align=right | 2.0 km || 
|-id=796 bgcolor=#fefefe
| 583796 ||  || — || February 13, 2010 || Mount Lemmon || Mount Lemmon Survey || H || align=right data-sort-value="0.49" | 490 m || 
|-id=797 bgcolor=#fefefe
| 583797 ||  || — || July 27, 2011 || Haleakala || Pan-STARRS || H || align=right data-sort-value="0.52" | 520 m || 
|-id=798 bgcolor=#fefefe
| 583798 ||  || — || October 19, 2011 || Catalina || CSS || H || align=right data-sort-value="0.81" | 810 m || 
|-id=799 bgcolor=#d6d6d6
| 583799 ||  || — || December 20, 2007 || Mount Lemmon || Mount Lemmon Survey ||  || align=right | 2.8 km || 
|-id=800 bgcolor=#d6d6d6
| 583800 ||  || — || February 28, 2009 || Kitt Peak || Spacewatch ||  || align=right | 2.8 km || 
|}

583801–583900 

|-bgcolor=#E9E9E9
| 583801 ||  || — || August 7, 2016 || Haleakala || Pan-STARRS ||  || align=right | 1.9 km || 
|-id=802 bgcolor=#d6d6d6
| 583802 ||  || — || May 11, 2015 || Haleakala || Pan-STARRS ||  || align=right | 3.3 km || 
|-id=803 bgcolor=#d6d6d6
| 583803 ||  || — || November 23, 2012 || Kitt Peak || Spacewatch ||  || align=right | 2.0 km || 
|-id=804 bgcolor=#d6d6d6
| 583804 ||  || — || March 2, 2009 || Mount Lemmon || Mount Lemmon Survey ||  || align=right | 2.3 km || 
|-id=805 bgcolor=#d6d6d6
| 583805 ||  || — || November 12, 2012 || Haleakala || Pan-STARRS ||  || align=right | 2.4 km || 
|-id=806 bgcolor=#d6d6d6
| 583806 ||  || — || January 30, 2008 || Mount Lemmon || Mount Lemmon Survey ||  || align=right | 2.4 km || 
|-id=807 bgcolor=#d6d6d6
| 583807 ||  || — || January 18, 2008 || Mount Lemmon || Mount Lemmon Survey ||  || align=right | 2.4 km || 
|-id=808 bgcolor=#d6d6d6
| 583808 ||  || — || January 17, 2008 || Mount Lemmon || Mount Lemmon Survey ||  || align=right | 2.7 km || 
|-id=809 bgcolor=#d6d6d6
| 583809 ||  || — || September 21, 2011 || Haleakala || Pan-STARRS ||  || align=right | 2.5 km || 
|-id=810 bgcolor=#d6d6d6
| 583810 ||  || — || August 7, 2016 || Haleakala || Pan-STARRS ||  || align=right | 2.5 km || 
|-id=811 bgcolor=#d6d6d6
| 583811 ||  || — || August 7, 2016 || Haleakala || Pan-STARRS ||  || align=right | 2.7 km || 
|-id=812 bgcolor=#d6d6d6
| 583812 ||  || — || August 7, 2016 || Haleakala || Pan-STARRS ||  || align=right | 2.7 km || 
|-id=813 bgcolor=#d6d6d6
| 583813 ||  || — || September 26, 2000 || Apache Point || SDSS Collaboration ||  || align=right | 1.8 km || 
|-id=814 bgcolor=#d6d6d6
| 583814 ||  || — || April 25, 2015 || Haleakala || Pan-STARRS ||  || align=right | 2.4 km || 
|-id=815 bgcolor=#d6d6d6
| 583815 ||  || — || May 26, 2015 || Haleakala || Pan-STARRS ||  || align=right | 2.2 km || 
|-id=816 bgcolor=#fefefe
| 583816 ||  || — || August 2, 2016 || Haleakala || Pan-STARRS ||  || align=right data-sort-value="0.62" | 620 m || 
|-id=817 bgcolor=#d6d6d6
| 583817 ||  || — || August 7, 2016 || Haleakala || Pan-STARRS ||  || align=right | 1.8 km || 
|-id=818 bgcolor=#d6d6d6
| 583818 ||  || — || March 18, 2015 || Haleakala || Pan-STARRS ||  || align=right | 2.4 km || 
|-id=819 bgcolor=#d6d6d6
| 583819 ||  || — || December 9, 2012 || Mount Lemmon || Mount Lemmon Survey ||  || align=right | 2.0 km || 
|-id=820 bgcolor=#d6d6d6
| 583820 ||  || — || May 19, 2010 || Mount Lemmon || Mount Lemmon Survey ||  || align=right | 2.2 km || 
|-id=821 bgcolor=#d6d6d6
| 583821 ||  || — || September 15, 2006 || Kitt Peak || Spacewatch ||  || align=right | 2.5 km || 
|-id=822 bgcolor=#d6d6d6
| 583822 ||  || — || October 26, 2001 || Kitt Peak || Spacewatch ||  || align=right | 2.3 km || 
|-id=823 bgcolor=#fefefe
| 583823 ||  || — || October 28, 2010 || Mount Lemmon || Mount Lemmon Survey ||  || align=right data-sort-value="0.59" | 590 m || 
|-id=824 bgcolor=#d6d6d6
| 583824 ||  || — || November 12, 2012 || Mount Lemmon || Mount Lemmon Survey ||  || align=right | 2.2 km || 
|-id=825 bgcolor=#d6d6d6
| 583825 ||  || — || May 12, 2015 || Mount Lemmon || Mount Lemmon Survey ||  || align=right | 2.7 km || 
|-id=826 bgcolor=#d6d6d6
| 583826 ||  || — || May 11, 2015 || Mount Lemmon || Mount Lemmon Survey ||  || align=right | 2.1 km || 
|-id=827 bgcolor=#d6d6d6
| 583827 ||  || — || September 27, 2011 || Kitt Peak || Spacewatch ||  || align=right | 3.1 km || 
|-id=828 bgcolor=#E9E9E9
| 583828 ||  || — || September 9, 2008 || Mount Lemmon || Mount Lemmon Survey ||  || align=right data-sort-value="0.86" | 860 m || 
|-id=829 bgcolor=#d6d6d6
| 583829 ||  || — || February 13, 2008 || Kitt Peak || Spacewatch ||  || align=right | 3.8 km || 
|-id=830 bgcolor=#d6d6d6
| 583830 ||  || — || August 25, 2005 || Campo Imperatore || A. Boattini ||  || align=right | 2.7 km || 
|-id=831 bgcolor=#d6d6d6
| 583831 ||  || — || July 9, 2016 || Haleakala || Pan-STARRS ||  || align=right | 3.3 km || 
|-id=832 bgcolor=#fefefe
| 583832 ||  || — || March 17, 2005 || Mount Lemmon || Mount Lemmon Survey || H || align=right data-sort-value="0.54" | 540 m || 
|-id=833 bgcolor=#d6d6d6
| 583833 ||  || — || May 21, 2015 || Haleakala || Pan-STARRS ||  || align=right | 2.0 km || 
|-id=834 bgcolor=#d6d6d6
| 583834 ||  || — || August 2, 2016 || Haleakala || Pan-STARRS ||  || align=right | 2.4 km || 
|-id=835 bgcolor=#E9E9E9
| 583835 ||  || — || September 3, 2007 || Catalina || CSS ||  || align=right | 1.5 km || 
|-id=836 bgcolor=#d6d6d6
| 583836 ||  || — || September 20, 2011 || Kitt Peak || Spacewatch ||  || align=right | 3.1 km || 
|-id=837 bgcolor=#d6d6d6
| 583837 ||  || — || January 4, 2013 || Cerro Tololo-DECam || CTIO-DECam ||  || align=right | 1.8 km || 
|-id=838 bgcolor=#d6d6d6
| 583838 ||  || — || March 13, 2004 || Palomar || NEAT ||  || align=right | 3.4 km || 
|-id=839 bgcolor=#d6d6d6
| 583839 ||  || — || November 16, 2011 || Mount Lemmon || Mount Lemmon Survey ||  || align=right | 2.0 km || 
|-id=840 bgcolor=#d6d6d6
| 583840 ||  || — || April 25, 2015 || Haleakala || Pan-STARRS ||  || align=right | 2.3 km || 
|-id=841 bgcolor=#d6d6d6
| 583841 ||  || — || October 8, 2007 || Mount Lemmon || Mount Lemmon Survey ||  || align=right | 1.7 km || 
|-id=842 bgcolor=#d6d6d6
| 583842 ||  || — || January 10, 2008 || Mount Lemmon || Mount Lemmon Survey ||  || align=right | 2.4 km || 
|-id=843 bgcolor=#E9E9E9
| 583843 ||  || — || September 27, 2008 || Mount Lemmon || Mount Lemmon Survey ||  || align=right data-sort-value="0.68" | 680 m || 
|-id=844 bgcolor=#d6d6d6
| 583844 ||  || — || August 2, 2016 || Haleakala || Pan-STARRS ||  || align=right | 2.3 km || 
|-id=845 bgcolor=#d6d6d6
| 583845 ||  || — || August 3, 2016 || Haleakala || Pan-STARRS ||  || align=right | 2.9 km || 
|-id=846 bgcolor=#d6d6d6
| 583846 ||  || — || January 17, 2008 || Mount Lemmon || Mount Lemmon Survey ||  || align=right | 2.3 km || 
|-id=847 bgcolor=#d6d6d6
| 583847 ||  || — || March 21, 2015 || Haleakala || Pan-STARRS ||  || align=right | 1.8 km || 
|-id=848 bgcolor=#d6d6d6
| 583848 ||  || — || May 21, 2015 || Haleakala || Pan-STARRS ||  || align=right | 2.2 km || 
|-id=849 bgcolor=#d6d6d6
| 583849 ||  || — || March 31, 2003 || Apache Point || SDSS Collaboration ||  || align=right | 3.5 km || 
|-id=850 bgcolor=#d6d6d6
| 583850 ||  || — || September 24, 2011 || Haleakala || Pan-STARRS ||  || align=right | 2.2 km || 
|-id=851 bgcolor=#d6d6d6
| 583851 ||  || — || September 4, 2011 || Haleakala || Pan-STARRS ||  || align=right | 2.4 km || 
|-id=852 bgcolor=#d6d6d6
| 583852 ||  || — || December 19, 2007 || Kitt Peak || Spacewatch ||  || align=right | 2.0 km || 
|-id=853 bgcolor=#d6d6d6
| 583853 ||  || — || September 23, 2011 || Kitt Peak || Spacewatch ||  || align=right | 2.5 km || 
|-id=854 bgcolor=#d6d6d6
| 583854 ||  || — || August 2, 2016 || Haleakala || Pan-STARRS ||  || align=right | 2.2 km || 
|-id=855 bgcolor=#d6d6d6
| 583855 ||  || — || December 12, 2012 || Mount Lemmon || Mount Lemmon Survey ||  || align=right | 1.8 km || 
|-id=856 bgcolor=#E9E9E9
| 583856 ||  || — || September 13, 2004 || Kitt Peak || Spacewatch ||  || align=right data-sort-value="0.95" | 950 m || 
|-id=857 bgcolor=#d6d6d6
| 583857 ||  || — || May 10, 2015 || Mount Lemmon || Mount Lemmon Survey ||  || align=right | 1.7 km || 
|-id=858 bgcolor=#d6d6d6
| 583858 ||  || — || April 20, 2015 || Haleakala || Pan-STARRS ||  || align=right | 2.2 km || 
|-id=859 bgcolor=#d6d6d6
| 583859 ||  || — || August 31, 2005 || Palomar || NEAT ||  || align=right | 1.8 km || 
|-id=860 bgcolor=#d6d6d6
| 583860 ||  || — || October 21, 2011 || Mount Lemmon || Mount Lemmon Survey ||  || align=right | 2.6 km || 
|-id=861 bgcolor=#d6d6d6
| 583861 ||  || — || August 2, 2016 || Haleakala || Pan-STARRS ||  || align=right | 2.3 km || 
|-id=862 bgcolor=#d6d6d6
| 583862 ||  || — || August 2, 2016 || Haleakala || Pan-STARRS ||  || align=right | 2.3 km || 
|-id=863 bgcolor=#d6d6d6
| 583863 ||  || — || October 24, 2011 || Haleakala || Pan-STARRS ||  || align=right | 2.3 km || 
|-id=864 bgcolor=#d6d6d6
| 583864 ||  || — || November 4, 2005 || Kitt Peak || Spacewatch ||  || align=right | 2.5 km || 
|-id=865 bgcolor=#d6d6d6
| 583865 ||  || — || August 2, 2016 || Haleakala || Pan-STARRS ||  || align=right | 2.0 km || 
|-id=866 bgcolor=#d6d6d6
| 583866 ||  || — || June 18, 2015 || Haleakala || Pan-STARRS ||  || align=right | 1.9 km || 
|-id=867 bgcolor=#d6d6d6
| 583867 ||  || — || January 29, 2003 || Kitt Peak || Spacewatch ||  || align=right | 2.4 km || 
|-id=868 bgcolor=#d6d6d6
| 583868 ||  || — || January 17, 2013 || Haleakala || Pan-STARRS ||  || align=right | 2.4 km || 
|-id=869 bgcolor=#d6d6d6
| 583869 ||  || — || August 7, 2016 || Haleakala || Pan-STARRS ||  || align=right | 2.3 km || 
|-id=870 bgcolor=#d6d6d6
| 583870 ||  || — || May 26, 2015 || Mount Lemmon || Mount Lemmon Survey ||  || align=right | 2.2 km || 
|-id=871 bgcolor=#E9E9E9
| 583871 ||  || — || March 31, 2011 || Mount Lemmon || Mount Lemmon Survey ||  || align=right | 1.2 km || 
|-id=872 bgcolor=#d6d6d6
| 583872 ||  || — || August 27, 2006 || Kitt Peak || Spacewatch ||  || align=right | 2.2 km || 
|-id=873 bgcolor=#d6d6d6
| 583873 ||  || — || November 24, 2011 || Mount Lemmon || Mount Lemmon Survey ||  || align=right | 2.1 km || 
|-id=874 bgcolor=#d6d6d6
| 583874 ||  || — || April 22, 2009 || Mount Lemmon || Mount Lemmon Survey ||  || align=right | 1.9 km || 
|-id=875 bgcolor=#d6d6d6
| 583875 ||  || — || November 19, 2006 || Kitt Peak || Spacewatch ||  || align=right | 2.1 km || 
|-id=876 bgcolor=#d6d6d6
| 583876 ||  || — || October 26, 2011 || Haleakala || Pan-STARRS ||  || align=right | 2.2 km || 
|-id=877 bgcolor=#d6d6d6
| 583877 ||  || — || August 10, 2016 || Haleakala || Pan-STARRS ||  || align=right | 2.3 km || 
|-id=878 bgcolor=#E9E9E9
| 583878 ||  || — || September 21, 2011 || Mount Lemmon || Mount Lemmon Survey ||  || align=right | 2.1 km || 
|-id=879 bgcolor=#d6d6d6
| 583879 ||  || — || October 13, 2002 || Palomar || NEAT ||  || align=right | 2.9 km || 
|-id=880 bgcolor=#d6d6d6
| 583880 ||  || — || August 28, 2005 || Kitt Peak || Spacewatch ||  || align=right | 2.3 km || 
|-id=881 bgcolor=#d6d6d6
| 583881 ||  || — || August 14, 2016 || Haleakala || Pan-STARRS ||  || align=right | 2.0 km || 
|-id=882 bgcolor=#d6d6d6
| 583882 ||  || — || February 12, 2013 || ESA OGS || ESA OGS ||  || align=right | 2.8 km || 
|-id=883 bgcolor=#d6d6d6
| 583883 ||  || — || February 28, 2014 || Haleakala || Pan-STARRS ||  || align=right | 2.4 km || 
|-id=884 bgcolor=#d6d6d6
| 583884 ||  || — || March 8, 2003 || Kitt Peak || Spacewatch ||  || align=right | 3.9 km || 
|-id=885 bgcolor=#d6d6d6
| 583885 ||  || — || August 26, 2005 || Palomar || NEAT ||  || align=right | 2.7 km || 
|-id=886 bgcolor=#d6d6d6
| 583886 ||  || — || September 29, 2005 || Mount Lemmon || Mount Lemmon Survey ||  || align=right | 2.5 km || 
|-id=887 bgcolor=#d6d6d6
| 583887 ||  || — || August 1, 2016 || Haleakala || Pan-STARRS ||  || align=right | 2.4 km || 
|-id=888 bgcolor=#d6d6d6
| 583888 ||  || — || August 1, 2016 || Haleakala || Pan-STARRS ||  || align=right | 2.4 km || 
|-id=889 bgcolor=#d6d6d6
| 583889 ||  || — || August 2, 2016 || Haleakala || Pan-STARRS ||  || align=right | 2.7 km || 
|-id=890 bgcolor=#E9E9E9
| 583890 ||  || — || May 25, 2006 || Mauna Kea || Mauna Kea Obs. ||  || align=right | 1.5 km || 
|-id=891 bgcolor=#d6d6d6
| 583891 ||  || — || August 9, 2016 || Haleakala || Pan-STARRS ||  || align=right | 2.2 km || 
|-id=892 bgcolor=#d6d6d6
| 583892 ||  || — || August 8, 2016 || Haleakala || Pan-STARRS ||  || align=right | 1.9 km || 
|-id=893 bgcolor=#d6d6d6
| 583893 ||  || — || August 7, 2016 || Haleakala || Pan-STARRS ||  || align=right | 2.1 km || 
|-id=894 bgcolor=#d6d6d6
| 583894 ||  || — || August 2, 2016 || Haleakala || Pan-STARRS ||  || align=right | 3.0 km || 
|-id=895 bgcolor=#d6d6d6
| 583895 ||  || — || August 2, 2016 || Haleakala || Pan-STARRS ||  || align=right | 2.4 km || 
|-id=896 bgcolor=#d6d6d6
| 583896 ||  || — || August 13, 2016 || Haleakala || Pan-STARRS ||  || align=right | 2.1 km || 
|-id=897 bgcolor=#d6d6d6
| 583897 ||  || — || August 10, 2016 || Haleakala || Pan-STARRS ||  || align=right | 2.3 km || 
|-id=898 bgcolor=#d6d6d6
| 583898 ||  || — || August 2, 2016 || Haleakala || Pan-STARRS || Tj (2.99) || align=right | 3.2 km || 
|-id=899 bgcolor=#d6d6d6
| 583899 ||  || — || August 11, 2016 || Haleakala || Pan-STARRS ||  || align=right | 2.6 km || 
|-id=900 bgcolor=#d6d6d6
| 583900 ||  || — || August 7, 2016 || Haleakala || Pan-STARRS ||  || align=right | 2.3 km || 
|}

583901–584000 

|-bgcolor=#d6d6d6
| 583901 ||  || — || August 1, 2016 || Haleakala || Pan-STARRS ||  || align=right | 2.6 km || 
|-id=902 bgcolor=#E9E9E9
| 583902 ||  || — || August 2, 2016 || Haleakala || Pan-STARRS ||  || align=right | 1.7 km || 
|-id=903 bgcolor=#d6d6d6
| 583903 ||  || — || August 1, 2016 || Haleakala || Pan-STARRS || Tj (2.99) || align=right | 2.6 km || 
|-id=904 bgcolor=#d6d6d6
| 583904 ||  || — || August 9, 2016 || Haleakala || Pan-STARRS ||  || align=right | 2.6 km || 
|-id=905 bgcolor=#fefefe
| 583905 ||  || — || August 3, 2016 || Haleakala || Pan-STARRS ||  || align=right data-sort-value="0.68" | 680 m || 
|-id=906 bgcolor=#d6d6d6
| 583906 ||  || — || March 9, 2003 || Palomar || NEAT ||  || align=right | 3.2 km || 
|-id=907 bgcolor=#E9E9E9
| 583907 ||  || — || September 15, 2012 || Nogales || M. Schwartz, P. R. Holvorcem ||  || align=right | 1.7 km || 
|-id=908 bgcolor=#d6d6d6
| 583908 ||  || — || October 18, 2011 || Siding Spring || SSS ||  || align=right | 2.7 km || 
|-id=909 bgcolor=#d6d6d6
| 583909 ||  || — || August 20, 2011 || Haleakala || Pan-STARRS ||  || align=right | 2.5 km || 
|-id=910 bgcolor=#d6d6d6
| 583910 ||  || — || July 7, 2016 || Haleakala || Pan-STARRS ||  || align=right | 1.8 km || 
|-id=911 bgcolor=#d6d6d6
| 583911 ||  || — || July 5, 2005 || Kitt Peak || Spacewatch ||  || align=right | 3.1 km || 
|-id=912 bgcolor=#fefefe
| 583912 ||  || — || November 25, 2013 || Haleakala || Pan-STARRS ||  || align=right data-sort-value="0.91" | 910 m || 
|-id=913 bgcolor=#d6d6d6
| 583913 ||  || — || August 26, 2016 || Mount Lemmon || Mount Lemmon Survey ||  || align=right | 2.2 km || 
|-id=914 bgcolor=#d6d6d6
| 583914 ||  || — || March 5, 2014 || Haleakala || Pan-STARRS ||  || align=right | 2.4 km || 
|-id=915 bgcolor=#fefefe
| 583915 ||  || — || April 28, 2012 || Mount Lemmon || Mount Lemmon Survey ||  || align=right data-sort-value="0.65" | 650 m || 
|-id=916 bgcolor=#d6d6d6
| 583916 ||  || — || July 30, 2000 || Cerro Tololo || M. W. Buie, S. D. Kern ||  || align=right | 2.1 km || 
|-id=917 bgcolor=#d6d6d6
| 583917 ||  || — || December 5, 2012 || Mount Lemmon || Mount Lemmon Survey ||  || align=right | 2.5 km || 
|-id=918 bgcolor=#d6d6d6
| 583918 ||  || — || September 19, 2011 || Haleakala || Pan-STARRS ||  || align=right | 2.1 km || 
|-id=919 bgcolor=#d6d6d6
| 583919 ||  || — || August 26, 2016 || Haleakala || Pan-STARRS ||  || align=right | 2.3 km || 
|-id=920 bgcolor=#E9E9E9
| 583920 ||  || — || August 14, 2016 || Haleakala || Pan-STARRS ||  || align=right | 1.5 km || 
|-id=921 bgcolor=#d6d6d6
| 583921 ||  || — || December 30, 2007 || Kitt Peak || Spacewatch ||  || align=right | 2.9 km || 
|-id=922 bgcolor=#d6d6d6
| 583922 ||  || — || December 18, 2007 || Mount Lemmon || Mount Lemmon Survey ||  || align=right | 2.9 km || 
|-id=923 bgcolor=#d6d6d6
| 583923 ||  || — || December 18, 2001 || Socorro || LINEAR ||  || align=right | 3.2 km || 
|-id=924 bgcolor=#d6d6d6
| 583924 ||  || — || September 20, 2011 || Mount Lemmon || Mount Lemmon Survey ||  || align=right | 2.1 km || 
|-id=925 bgcolor=#d6d6d6
| 583925 ||  || — || October 21, 2011 || Mount Lemmon || Mount Lemmon Survey ||  || align=right | 2.2 km || 
|-id=926 bgcolor=#d6d6d6
| 583926 ||  || — || December 21, 2012 || Mount Lemmon || Mount Lemmon Survey ||  || align=right | 2.1 km || 
|-id=927 bgcolor=#d6d6d6
| 583927 ||  || — || September 17, 2006 || Kitt Peak || Spacewatch ||  || align=right | 2.9 km || 
|-id=928 bgcolor=#d6d6d6
| 583928 ||  || — || April 18, 2010 || Cerro Burek || Alianza S4 Obs. ||  || align=right | 3.0 km || 
|-id=929 bgcolor=#d6d6d6
| 583929 ||  || — || October 16, 2007 || Mount Lemmon || Mount Lemmon Survey ||  || align=right | 2.1 km || 
|-id=930 bgcolor=#d6d6d6
| 583930 ||  || — || October 23, 2011 || Mount Lemmon || Mount Lemmon Survey ||  || align=right | 2.0 km || 
|-id=931 bgcolor=#d6d6d6
| 583931 ||  || — || September 27, 2011 || Mount Lemmon || Mount Lemmon Survey ||  || align=right | 3.3 km || 
|-id=932 bgcolor=#d6d6d6
| 583932 ||  || — || July 1, 2011 || Mount Lemmon || Mount Lemmon Survey ||  || align=right | 2.2 km || 
|-id=933 bgcolor=#d6d6d6
| 583933 ||  || — || September 23, 2011 || Haleakala || Pan-STARRS ||  || align=right | 2.3 km || 
|-id=934 bgcolor=#d6d6d6
| 583934 ||  || — || May 18, 2015 || Haleakala || Pan-STARRS 2 ||  || align=right | 2.2 km || 
|-id=935 bgcolor=#fefefe
| 583935 ||  || — || August 25, 2001 || Kitt Peak || Spacewatch ||  || align=right data-sort-value="0.75" | 750 m || 
|-id=936 bgcolor=#fefefe
| 583936 ||  || — || September 11, 2002 || Palomar || NEAT ||  || align=right data-sort-value="0.65" | 650 m || 
|-id=937 bgcolor=#d6d6d6
| 583937 ||  || — || September 4, 2011 || Kitt Peak || Spacewatch ||  || align=right | 2.4 km || 
|-id=938 bgcolor=#d6d6d6
| 583938 ||  || — || November 5, 2007 || Kitt Peak || Spacewatch ||  || align=right | 2.3 km || 
|-id=939 bgcolor=#d6d6d6
| 583939 ||  || — || September 18, 2011 || Mount Lemmon || Mount Lemmon Survey ||  || align=right | 2.2 km || 
|-id=940 bgcolor=#d6d6d6
| 583940 ||  || — || April 2, 2015 || Haleakala || Pan-STARRS ||  || align=right | 2.1 km || 
|-id=941 bgcolor=#fefefe
| 583941 ||  || — || April 1, 2008 || Kitt Peak || Spacewatch ||  || align=right data-sort-value="0.75" | 750 m || 
|-id=942 bgcolor=#d6d6d6
| 583942 ||  || — || November 2, 2011 || Mount Lemmon || Mount Lemmon Survey ||  || align=right | 2.4 km || 
|-id=943 bgcolor=#fefefe
| 583943 ||  || — || July 14, 2016 || Haleakala || Pan-STARRS ||  || align=right data-sort-value="0.78" | 780 m || 
|-id=944 bgcolor=#d6d6d6
| 583944 ||  || — || September 8, 2000 || Kitt Peak || Spacewatch ||  || align=right | 2.5 km || 
|-id=945 bgcolor=#d6d6d6
| 583945 ||  || — || July 11, 2016 || Haleakala || Pan-STARRS ||  || align=right | 2.4 km || 
|-id=946 bgcolor=#d6d6d6
| 583946 ||  || — || August 28, 2016 || Mount Lemmon || Mount Lemmon Survey ||  || align=right | 2.5 km || 
|-id=947 bgcolor=#d6d6d6
| 583947 ||  || — || September 26, 2011 || Kitt Peak || Spacewatch ||  || align=right | 2.7 km || 
|-id=948 bgcolor=#d6d6d6
| 583948 ||  || — || February 17, 2007 || Palomar || NEAT ||  || align=right | 3.0 km || 
|-id=949 bgcolor=#d6d6d6
| 583949 ||  || — || September 30, 2011 || Piszkesteto || K. Sárneczky ||  || align=right | 3.9 km || 
|-id=950 bgcolor=#d6d6d6
| 583950 ||  || — || March 16, 2004 || Kitt Peak || Spacewatch ||  || align=right | 2.9 km || 
|-id=951 bgcolor=#d6d6d6
| 583951 ||  || — || May 15, 2015 || Haleakala || Pan-STARRS ||  || align=right | 2.3 km || 
|-id=952 bgcolor=#d6d6d6
| 583952 ||  || — || December 11, 2012 || Mount Lemmon || Mount Lemmon Survey ||  || align=right | 2.9 km || 
|-id=953 bgcolor=#d6d6d6
| 583953 ||  || — || September 19, 2011 || Haleakala || Pan-STARRS ||  || align=right | 2.0 km || 
|-id=954 bgcolor=#d6d6d6
| 583954 ||  || — || September 20, 2011 || Haleakala || Pan-STARRS ||  || align=right | 1.9 km || 
|-id=955 bgcolor=#d6d6d6
| 583955 ||  || — || February 8, 2008 || Mount Lemmon || Mount Lemmon Survey ||  || align=right | 2.5 km || 
|-id=956 bgcolor=#d6d6d6
| 583956 ||  || — || May 21, 2015 || Haleakala || Pan-STARRS ||  || align=right | 2.2 km || 
|-id=957 bgcolor=#d6d6d6
| 583957 ||  || — || February 28, 2014 || Haleakala || Pan-STARRS ||  || align=right | 2.6 km || 
|-id=958 bgcolor=#d6d6d6
| 583958 ||  || — || August 3, 2016 || Haleakala || Pan-STARRS ||  || align=right | 1.9 km || 
|-id=959 bgcolor=#d6d6d6
| 583959 ||  || — || September 18, 2006 || Kitt Peak || Spacewatch ||  || align=right | 2.1 km || 
|-id=960 bgcolor=#fefefe
| 583960 ||  || — || September 16, 2003 || Kitt Peak || Spacewatch ||  || align=right data-sort-value="0.49" | 490 m || 
|-id=961 bgcolor=#d6d6d6
| 583961 ||  || — || September 19, 2011 || Haleakala || Pan-STARRS ||  || align=right | 2.3 km || 
|-id=962 bgcolor=#d6d6d6
| 583962 ||  || — || January 26, 2014 || Calar Alto-CASADO || S. Mottola, S. Hellmich ||  || align=right | 2.1 km || 
|-id=963 bgcolor=#d6d6d6
| 583963 ||  || — || November 12, 2007 || Mount Lemmon || Mount Lemmon Survey ||  || align=right | 2.8 km || 
|-id=964 bgcolor=#d6d6d6
| 583964 ||  || — || December 31, 2007 || Kitt Peak || Spacewatch ||  || align=right | 3.2 km || 
|-id=965 bgcolor=#d6d6d6
| 583965 ||  || — || July 30, 2005 || Palomar || NEAT ||  || align=right | 3.9 km || 
|-id=966 bgcolor=#d6d6d6
| 583966 ||  || — || January 4, 2013 || Cerro Tololo-DECam || CTIO-DECam ||  || align=right | 1.9 km || 
|-id=967 bgcolor=#d6d6d6
| 583967 ||  || — || July 29, 2005 || Palomar || NEAT ||  || align=right | 2.4 km || 
|-id=968 bgcolor=#d6d6d6
| 583968 ||  || — || March 8, 2008 || Mount Lemmon || Mount Lemmon Survey ||  || align=right | 2.7 km || 
|-id=969 bgcolor=#d6d6d6
| 583969 ||  || — || October 11, 1999 || Kitt Peak || Spacewatch ||  || align=right | 2.4 km || 
|-id=970 bgcolor=#fefefe
| 583970 ||  || — || August 29, 2005 || Kitt Peak || Spacewatch ||  || align=right data-sort-value="0.78" | 780 m || 
|-id=971 bgcolor=#d6d6d6
| 583971 ||  || — || November 1, 2011 || Catalina || CSS ||  || align=right | 3.0 km || 
|-id=972 bgcolor=#d6d6d6
| 583972 ||  || — || October 22, 2011 || Zelenchukskaya Stn || T. V. Kryachko, B. Satovski ||  || align=right | 3.3 km || 
|-id=973 bgcolor=#fefefe
| 583973 ||  || — || August 6, 2005 || Palomar || NEAT ||  || align=right data-sort-value="0.82" | 820 m || 
|-id=974 bgcolor=#fefefe
| 583974 ||  || — || June 10, 2012 || Mount Lemmon || Mount Lemmon Survey ||  || align=right data-sort-value="0.54" | 540 m || 
|-id=975 bgcolor=#d6d6d6
| 583975 ||  || — || December 2, 2000 || Haleakala || AMOS ||  || align=right | 3.6 km || 
|-id=976 bgcolor=#d6d6d6
| 583976 ||  || — || September 27, 2011 || Bergisch Gladbach || W. Bickel ||  || align=right | 2.9 km || 
|-id=977 bgcolor=#d6d6d6
| 583977 ||  || — || August 6, 2005 || Palomar || NEAT ||  || align=right | 2.8 km || 
|-id=978 bgcolor=#d6d6d6
| 583978 ||  || — || May 18, 2015 || Haleakala || Pan-STARRS 2 ||  || align=right | 2.4 km || 
|-id=979 bgcolor=#d6d6d6
| 583979 ||  || — || September 28, 2006 || Catalina || CSS ||  || align=right | 3.2 km || 
|-id=980 bgcolor=#d6d6d6
| 583980 ||  || — || April 13, 2004 || Kitt Peak || Spacewatch ||  || align=right | 2.5 km || 
|-id=981 bgcolor=#fefefe
| 583981 ||  || — || December 29, 2014 || Haleakala || Pan-STARRS || H || align=right data-sort-value="0.59" | 590 m || 
|-id=982 bgcolor=#fefefe
| 583982 ||  || — || January 18, 2015 || Haleakala || Pan-STARRS || H || align=right data-sort-value="0.57" | 570 m || 
|-id=983 bgcolor=#FA8072
| 583983 ||  || — || November 27, 2014 || Haleakala || Pan-STARRS || H || align=right data-sort-value="0.63" | 630 m || 
|-id=984 bgcolor=#fefefe
| 583984 ||  || — || April 17, 2015 || Mount Lemmon || Mount Lemmon Survey || H || align=right data-sort-value="0.56" | 560 m || 
|-id=985 bgcolor=#E9E9E9
| 583985 ||  || — || August 30, 2016 || Haleakala || Pan-STARRS ||  || align=right data-sort-value="0.94" | 940 m || 
|-id=986 bgcolor=#d6d6d6
| 583986 ||  || — || November 24, 2006 || Mount Lemmon || Mount Lemmon Survey ||  || align=right | 2.2 km || 
|-id=987 bgcolor=#d6d6d6
| 583987 ||  || — || December 23, 2012 || Haleakala || Pan-STARRS ||  || align=right | 2.6 km || 
|-id=988 bgcolor=#d6d6d6
| 583988 ||  || — || September 25, 2011 || Haleakala || Pan-STARRS ||  || align=right | 2.3 km || 
|-id=989 bgcolor=#d6d6d6
| 583989 ||  || — || April 24, 2014 || Mount Lemmon || Mount Lemmon Survey ||  || align=right | 2.8 km || 
|-id=990 bgcolor=#d6d6d6
| 583990 ||  || — || November 25, 2011 || Haleakala || Pan-STARRS ||  || align=right | 2.6 km || 
|-id=991 bgcolor=#d6d6d6
| 583991 ||  || — || September 19, 2011 || Haleakala || Pan-STARRS ||  || align=right | 2.6 km || 
|-id=992 bgcolor=#d6d6d6
| 583992 ||  || — || September 1, 2005 || Kitt Peak || Spacewatch ||  || align=right | 1.9 km || 
|-id=993 bgcolor=#d6d6d6
| 583993 ||  || — || September 21, 2000 || Kitt Peak || R. Millis, R. M. Wagner ||  || align=right | 2.3 km || 
|-id=994 bgcolor=#d6d6d6
| 583994 ||  || — || February 3, 2013 || Haleakala || Pan-STARRS ||  || align=right | 2.5 km || 
|-id=995 bgcolor=#d6d6d6
| 583995 ||  || — || May 11, 2015 || Mount Lemmon || Mount Lemmon Survey ||  || align=right | 2.4 km || 
|-id=996 bgcolor=#d6d6d6
| 583996 ||  || — || April 1, 2003 || Apache Point || SDSS Collaboration ||  || align=right | 2.5 km || 
|-id=997 bgcolor=#d6d6d6
| 583997 ||  || — || August 29, 2016 || Piszkesteto || K. Sárneczky, P. Székely ||  || align=right | 3.1 km || 
|-id=998 bgcolor=#d6d6d6
| 583998 ||  || — || August 30, 2016 || Mount Lemmon || Mount Lemmon Survey ||  || align=right | 2.7 km || 
|-id=999 bgcolor=#d6d6d6
| 583999 ||  || — || August 28, 2016 || Mount Lemmon || Mount Lemmon Survey ||  || align=right | 2.5 km || 
|-id=000 bgcolor=#d6d6d6
| 584000 ||  || — || August 28, 2016 || Mount Lemmon || Mount Lemmon Survey ||  || align=right | 2.3 km || 
|}

References

External links 
 Discovery Circumstances: Numbered Minor Planets (580001)–(585000) (IAU Minor Planet Center)

0583